= List of Mensans =

This list of Mensans contains notable members of Mensa International, the high IQ society, both living and deceased.

== A ==
- Scott Adams – cartoonist, creator of Dilbert, former member
- Simon Ambrose – winner of Britain's Apprentice television show
- Arlan Andrews – American engineer, writer of science fiction and non-fiction
- Isaac Asimov – prolific author, former vice-president of Mensa International
- Jean Auel – author of The Clan of the Cave Bear
- Yank Azman – actor, antiques expert

== B ==
- Norbert-Bertrand Barbe – French art historian, semiologist, artist and writer
- Jacques Bergier – chemical engineer, member of the French resistance, spy, journalist and writer
- Roland Berrill – lawyer, businessman and co-founder of Mensa
- Theodore Bikel – actor, musician
- Santiago Bilinkis – Argentinian entrepreneur, writer, philosopher and influencer.
- Richard Bolles – self-help author
- Laurie Brokenshire – Royal Naval officer, magician and world-class puzzle solver
- Cyril Burt – educational psychologist, developer of factor analysis in psychological testing
- Eileen Rose Busby – antiques expert

== C ==
- Mike Carona – former Sheriff–Coroner of Orange County, California
- Asia Carrera – former pornographic actress and blogger
- Leslie Charteris – writer and author of The Saint novels, featuring Simon Templar.
- Chino XL – rapper (born Derek Keith Barbosa)
- Marshall Christmann – former member of the Kansas House of Representatives and a current Kansas Judge, Labor Union Negotiator, City Councilman, and Mediator
- Jack Cohen – reproductive biologist and popular science writer
- Martin Cooper – considered the inventor of the mobile phone
- Adrian Cronauer – real-life inspiration for the movie Good Morning, Vietnam
- Manuel Cuni – known professionally as Immanuel Casto, is an Italian singer-songwriter and activist.
- Bobby Czyz – boxer, former two-time World Boxing Association Cruiserweight Champion

== D ==
- Aaron Dai – pianist, composer, architect
- Geena Davis – Academy Award-winning actress
- Alain de Benoist – French political philosopher and journalist
- Adragon De Mello – American college graduate at age 11
- C. J. de Mooi – competitive chess player, quiz show champion, and Egghead
- Nelson DeMille – author of Night Fall
- Lucas di Grassi – Brazilian racing driver
- Viacheslav Dinerchtein – concert violist
- Doda – Polish pop singer (born Dorota Rabczewska)
- Emma Dumont – American actress, model and dancer

== E ==
- Rose Elliot - British vegetarian cookery writer

== F ==
- Brian J. Ford – biologist
- Ernestine Fu – venture capitalist
- Yvonne Fovargue – Member of Parliament, UK Parliament

== G ==
- Antonella Gambotto-Burke – Australian author and journalist
- Rolf Gindorf – German sexologist and gay activist
- Tilman Goins – American politician, Tennessee House of Representatives
- Nolan Gould – American actor, Modern Family

== H ==
- Chris Hadfield – retired Canadian astronaut, served as commander of the International Space Station
- Kyle Hamilton – professional football player; safety for the Baltimore Ravens
- Jeremy Hanley – former Chairman of the Conservative Party in England
- Kara Hayward – actress, starred in the 2012 movie Moonrise Kingdom
- Glenne Headly – Emmy-nominated actress
- Amelia Henderson – actress, model
- Tom Herman – former Texas Longhorns Football head coach
- Alfred George Hinds – British criminal and prison escape artist who later used his legal knowledge to obtain a full pardon
- Robinson Hoto – Mathematician and holder of a doctorate in Systems Engineering; author of scientific papers on combinatorial optimization and a university professor.

== I ==
- Charles Ingram – novelist and quiz show cheat
- Lucy Irvine – author of Castaway

== J ==
- Kym Jackson – Australian actress, author
- Bella Jarrett – American actress, novelist
- Philip Johnston (entrepreneur) – Co-Founder & CEO of Starcloud

== K ==
- Yūka Kageyama, Japanese singer and television presenter
- Maurice Kanbar – creator of SKYY vodka and inventor
- William H. Keith Jr. – science fiction author, sci-fi games designer and illustrator
- Cathy Kelley – journalist and interviewer at WWE.
- James Kerwin – director
- Kotori Koiwai – Japanese voice actress, lyricist, composer
- Grover Krantz – American biological anthropologist
- Erik Kuselias – ESPN radio and television personality

== L ==
- Bernie LaBarge – musician
- Mell Lazarus – cartoonist, creator of comic strips Miss Peach and Momma
- Richard Lederer – author of books on word play
- Jamie Loftus – comedian and podcaster
- Ranan Lurie – editorial cartoonist and journalist

== M ==
- Andrzej Majewski – writer, aphorist, and photographer
- John McAfee – computer programmer, founder of McAfee, Inc., one of the first people to design anti-virus software
- Janet McDonald – lawyer and author of African American young adult novels
- Alan McFarland – former MLA for North Down, United Kingdom
- Jonathan McReynolds – Grammy award-winning gospel artist, actor
- Henry Milligan – boxer and scholar, 1983 US National Amateur Heavyweight champion
- Gert Mittring – mental calculator
- Regan Mizrahi – child actor, won 2011 Young Artist Award for the voice of Boots in Dora the Explorer
- Cícero Moraes – Brazilian 3D designer and forensic facial reconstruction specialist
- Roger Moreira – Brazilian musician, member of Ultraje a Rigor
- Ellen Morphonios – Florida judge
- Michael Muhney – actor in Veronica Mars and The Young and the Restless
- Ellen Muth – actress in Dolores Claiborne and Dead Like Me

== N ==
- Miki Nadal – Spanish comedian
- Barry Nolan – Says You! panelist

== O ==
- Joyce Carol Oates – author of The Gravedigger's Daughter
- Brendan O'Carroll – Irish comedian
- Adam Osborne – computer designer, software publisher, creator of the Osborne 1

== P ==
- Park Kyung – South Korean rapper
- Gareth Penn – author and private investigator
- Markus Persson – Creator and developer of Minecraft
- Donald Petersen – former CEO of the Ford Motor Company
- Julie Peterson – Playboy Playmate of the Month, February 1987
- Uroš Petrović – Serbian author, President of Serbian Mensa
- Nicky Piper – boxer
- Madsen Pirie – philosopher and economist
- Robert Prechter – American financial author and stock market analyst
- Princess Superstar – American rapper and DJ (born Concetta Suzanne Kirschner)

== R ==
- Alan Rachins – actor on L.A. Law and Dharma & Greg
- Raven – professional wrestler (born Scott Levy)
- Ashley Rickards – actress
- Radoslav Rochallyi – Slovak philosopher, writer and poet
- Ginny Ruffner – American glass artist

== S ==
- Jimmy Savile – English DJ, television/radio personality, and sexual predator
- Norman Schwarzkopf Jr. – US Army General, planner of Operation Desert Storm
- Margot Seitelman – first executive director of American Mensa
- Victor Serebriakoff – author and former international president of Mensa
- Alexander Shulgin – medicinal chemist, biochemist, and rediscoverer of MDMA (ecstasy)
- Clive Sinclair – inventor of the Sinclair Executive pocket calculator, founder of Sinclair Research, member of British Mensa, and chairman from 1980 to 1997
- Scott Sonnon – public speaker and celebrity fitness coach
- Katariina Souri – Finnish writer, singer and Playboy Playmate of the Month for December 1988
- E. Lee Spence – shipwreck expert, pioneer underwater archaeologist and discoverer of the H.L. Hunley submarine
- Jessica Steinhauser – American attorney and former pornographic actress
- Peter A. Sturgeon – founder of American Mensa, medical writer, brother of Theodore Sturgeon

== T ==
- Ruben Talberg – German painter/sculptor

== V ==
- Carol Vorderman – British television presenter
- Marilyn vos Savant – last person listed in the Guinness Book of World Records under "Highest IQ" (category has been withdrawn)

== W ==
- David Warburton – MP, composer and entrepreneur
- Lancelot Ware – barrister, biochemist, and co-founder of Mensa

== Z ==
- Roger Zelazny – American writer
