= Law School Admission Test =

US and Canadian standardized test

- Acronym: LSAT
- Type: Standardized test
- Administrator: Law School Admission Council
- Skills tested: Reading comprehension, logical reasoning, and (unscored) writing
- Purpose: Admissions to Juris Doctor programs of law schools in the US, Canada, and some other countries
- Year started: 1948
- Duration: 35 minutes for each of the 4 sections, for a total of 2 hours and 20 minutes (excluding breaks) + 50 minutes for Writing section
- Score range: 120 to 180, in 1 point increments
- Score validity: Scores of up to 12 tests taken since 1 June 2008 are valid
- Offered: As of 2023, 9 times a year, with dates listed on the LSAC website.
- Restrictions on attempts: Starting August 2023, no more than 5 attempts in 5 years, no more than 7 attempts in a lifetime. Exceptions may be granted for special circumstances.
- Regions: Worldwide
- Languages: English
- Annual number of test takers: ▲129,165 in 2017–2018
- Fee: LSAT fee: US$238 CAS fee: US$207
- Used by: Law schools in the US, Canada, Australia and some other countries
- Website: www.lsac.org/jd/lsat

Fall 2012 international applicants to ABA-approved law schools (includes data only for countries where count >= 50).
Country	Number of applicants
Canada	1,306
China	458
South Korea	408
India	151
Mexico	147
Nigeria	125
United Kingdom	96
Colombia	83
Jamaica	81
Russia	70
Pakistan	70
Brazil	64

The Law School Admission Test (LSAT /ˈɛlsæt/ EL-sat) is a standardized test administered by the Law School Admission Council (LSAC) for prospective law school candidates. It is designed to assess reading comprehension and logical reasoning. The test is an integral part of the law school admission process in the United States, Canada (common law programs only) and a growing number of other countries.

The test has existed in some form since 1948, when it was created to give law schools a standardized way to assess applicants in addition to their GPA. The current form of the exam has been used since 1991. The exam has four total sections that include three scored multiple choice sections, an unscored experimental section, and an unscored writing section. Raw scores on the exam are transformed into scaled scores, ranging from a high of 180 to a low of 120, with a median score typically around 150. Law school applicants are required to report all scores from the past five years, though schools generally consider the highest score in their admissions decisions.

Before July 2019, the test was administered by paper and pencil, with in-person testing only. In 2019, the test began to be administered exclusively electronically using a tablet, with test-takers still sitting for the exam in-person in testing centers. In 2020, due to the COVID-19 pandemic, the test was administered remotely, with test-takers using their personal computers at home. Beginning in 2023, candidates had the option to take a digital version either at an approved testing center or on their computer at home. In 2026, following allegations of widespread cheating on the LSAT, LSAC announced that the test would return to in-person testing at testing centers only, except in limited circumstances due to "certain medical accommodations or extreme hardship in getting to a testing center."

== Function ==
The purpose of the LSAT is to aid in predicting student success in law school. Researchers Balin, Fine, and Guinier performed research on the LSAT's ability to predict law school grades at the University of Pennsylvania. They found that the LSAT could explain about 14% of the variance in first year grades and about 15% of the variance in second year grades.

== History ==
In 1945, Frank Bowles, a Columbia Law School admissions director, asked whether a better law school admissions test could be developed to replacing Columbia Law School's admission exam. The goal was to find a test that would correlate with predicted first-year grades rather than bar passage rates. Representatives from Columbia Law School, Harvard Law School and Yale Law School ultimately began to draft the test used as the first administration of the LSAT exam. NYU, in correspondence by memorandum, was openly unconvinced "about the usefulness of an aptitude test as a method of selecting law school students," but was open to experimenting with the idea, as were other schools that were unconvinced. The design of the LSAT was discussed on 10 November 1947, at a meeting of representatives of law schools extending beyond the original Columbia, Harvard, and Yale representatives. Although the issue of a how to test students from primarily "technical" backgrounds thought to be deficient in the study of history and literature was discussed, no method was adopted. The first administration of the LSAT occurred in 1948.

From the test's inception until 1981, scores were reported on a scale of 200 to 800; from 1981 to 1991, a 48-point scale was used. In 1991, the scale was changed again, so that reported scores range from 120 to 180.

=== Online test ===
Due to the COVID-19 pandemic, The Law School Admission Council created the LSAT-Flex. The LSAT-Flex is an online proctored test that was first administrated during May 2020. While the normal LSAT test consisted of four sections plus an experimental section (1 section of logic games, 1 section of reading comprehension, 2 sections of logical reasoning, and an additional random section), the LSAT-Flex consists of three sections (1 section of logic games, 1 section of reading comprehension, and 1 section of logical reasoning). Though the LSAT-Flex contains one less section than the normal LSAT test, the LSAT-Flex is scored on the normal 120–180 scale. After June 2021, the name LSAT-Flex was dropped and the test was again referred to as just the LSAT, though the format continued to be used through the testing cycle that ended in June 2022. Beginning with the August 2022 administration, LSAC reintroduced an experimental section, having the test consist of three sections plus an experimental section (one section of logic games, one section of reading comprehension, one section of logical reasoning, and an additional random section). The writing section is also administered online.

=== Former analytical reasoning section ===
Prior to August 2024, the LSAT contained an analytical reasoning section, commonly referred to as logic games. The section was removed following a 2019 legal settlement between the LSAC and blind LSAT test takers who claimed that the section violated the Americans with Disabilities Act because they were unfairly penalized for not being able to draw the diagrams commonly used to solve the questions in the section. As part of the settlement, the LSAC agreed to review and overhaul the section within four years. In October 2023, it announced that the section would be replaced by a second logical reasoning section in August 2024.

== Administration ==
The LSAC previously administered the LSAT four times per year: June, September/October, December and February. However, in June 2017, it was announced that the LSAC would be increasing the number of tests from four to six, and would instead be administering it in January, March, June, July, September, and November.

There were 129,925 LSATs administered in the 2011–12 testing year (June 2011 – February 2012), the largest percentage decline in LSATs administered in more than 10 years, and a drop of more than 16% from the previous year, when 155,050 LSATs were administered. The number of LSATs administered fell more than 25% over a two-year period (from the 2009–10 testing year to the 2011–12 testing year). The October 2012 administration reflected a 16.4% drop in volume from its 2011 counterpart. LSAT numbers continued to drop over the next two cycles but to a lesser degree, with 13.4% and 6.2% drops, respectively, for the 2012–13 and 2013–14 cycles. February 2014 showed the first increase in test takers (1.1%) since June 2010.

In December 2018, LSAC announced that the Microsoft Surface Go tablet will be used exclusively to administer the LSAT beginning in 2019 when the test transitions to a digital only format. However, following the COVID-19 pandemic, candidates are able to sit for the test remotely with their own computer. The writing sample section will be separate from the LSAT starting with the 3 June 2019 test administration. Candidates will be automatically eligible to complete the writing section as early as 10 days prior to test day and up to one year thereafter. Candidates only need to complete the writing sample section once every 5 years, even if candidates re-test before then.

== Test composition ==
The LSAT consists of four 35-minute multiple-choice sections (one of which is an unscored experimental section) as well as an unscored writing sample section that can be taken separately. Modern tests have 75–76 scored items in total. Several different test forms are used within an administration, each presenting the multiple-choice sections in different orders, which is intended to make it difficult to cheat or to guess which is the experimental section.

=== Logical reasoning ===
As of 2026, the LSAT contains two logical reasoning ("LR") sections, commonly known as "arguments", designed to test the taker's ability to dissect and analyze arguments. LR sections each contain 24–26 questions. Each question begins with a short argument or set of facts. This is followed by a prompt asking the test taker to find the argument's assumption, to select an alternate conclusion to the argument, to identify errors or logical omissions in the argument, to find another argument with parallel reasoning, or to choose a statement that would weaken or strengthen the argument.

In October 2023, the LSAC announced that the analytical reasoning (logic games) section would be replaced by a second logical reasoning section in August 2024 pursuant to the implementation of a 2019 settlement agreement with blind LSAT test takers.

=== Reading comprehension ===
The LSAT contains one reading comprehension ("RC") section consisting of four passages of 400–500 words, and 5–8 questions relating to each passage. Complete sections contain 26–28 questions. Though no real rules govern the content of this section, the passages generally relate to law, arts and humanities, physical sciences, or social sciences. The questions usually ask the examinee to determine the author's main idea, find specific information in the passage, draw inferences from the text, and/or describe the structure of the passage.

In June 2007, one of the four passages was replaced with a "comparative reading" question. Comparative reading presents two shorter passages with differing perspectives on a topic. Parallels exist between the comparative reading question, the SAT's critical reading section, and the science section of the ACT.

=== Unscored variable section ===
The current test contains one experimental section that is referred to as the "variable section." It is used to test new questions for future exams. The performance of the examinee on this section is not reported as part of the final score. The examinee is not told which section of the exam is experimental, since doing so could skew the data. Previously, this section was one of the first three sections of any given test, but beginning with the administration of the October 2011 LSAT, the experimental section can appear after the first three sections. LSAC makes no specific claim as to where it has appeared in the past or in which section(s) it may appear in the future.

=== Writing sample ===
The writing sample is presented in the form of a decision prompt, which provides the examinee with a problem and two criteria for making a decision. The examinee must then write an essay arguing for one of the two options over the other. The decision prompt generally does not involve a controversial subject, but rather something mundane about which the examinee likely has no strong bias. While there is no "right" or "wrong" answer to the writing prompt, it is important that the examinee argues for his/her chosen position and also argues against the counter-position.

LSAC does not score the writing sample. Instead, the essay is sent to admission offices along with the LSAT score. Some admissions officers regard the usefulness of the writing sample to be marginal. Additionally, most schools require that applicants submit a "personal statement" of some kind. These factors sometimes result in admission boards disregarding the writing sample. However, only 6.8% of 157 schools surveyed by LSAC in 2006 indicated that they "never" use the writing sample when evaluating an application. In contrast, 9.9% of the schools reported that they "always" use the sample; 25.3% reported that they "frequently" use the sample; 32.7% responded "occasionally"; and 25.3% reported "seldom" using the sample.

== Preparation ==
LSAC recommends advance preparation for the LSAT, due to the importance of the LSAT in law school admissions and because scores on the exam typically correspond to preparation time. The structure of the LSAT and the types of questions asked are generally consistent from year to year, which allows students to practice on question types that show up frequently in examinations.

LSAC suggests, at a minimum, that students review official practice tests, called PrepTests, before test day to familiarize themselves with the types of questions that appear on the exams. LSAC offers four free tests that can be downloaded from their website. For best results, LSAC suggests taking practice tests under actual time constraints and representative conditions in order to identify problem areas to focus on in further review.

For preparation purposes, only tests after June 1991 are considered modern, since the LSAT was significantly modified after this date. Each released exam is commonly referred to as a PrepTest. There are over 90 PrepTests in circulation, the oldest being the June 1991 LSAT numbered as PrepTest 1 and the newest being a July 2020 LSAT numbered as PrepTest 94+. Certain PrepTests are no longer published by LSAC (among them 1–6, 8, 17, 39, and 40), despite the fact that they were in print at one time. However, these tests have been made available through some of the test preparation companies, which have licensed them from LSAC to provide only to students in their courses. For a few years, some prep companies sold digital copies of LSAT PrepTests as PDFs, but LSAC revised its licensing policy in 2016, effectively banning the sale of LSAT PDFs to the general public.

Some students taking the LSAT use a test preparation company. Students who do not use these courses often rely on material from LSAT preparation books, previously administered exams, and internet resources such as blogs, forums, and mobile apps.

== Scoring ==
The LSAT is a standardized test in that LSAC adjusts raw scores to fit an expected norm to overcome the likelihood that some administrations may be more difficult than others. Normalized scores are distributed on a scale with a low of 120 to a high of 180.

The LSAT system of scoring is predetermined and does not reflect test takers' percentile. The relationship between raw questions answered correctly (the "raw score") and scaled score is determined before the test is administered, through a process called equating. This means that the conversion standard is set beforehand, and the distribution of percentiles can vary during the scoring of any particular LSAT.

Adjusted scores lie in a bell curve, tapering off at the extremes and concentrating near the median. For example, there might be a 3–5 question difference between a score of 175 and a score of 180, but the difference between a 155 from a 160 could be 9 or more questions—this is because the LSAT uses an ordinal grading system. Although the exact percentile of a given score will vary slightly between examinations, there tends to be little variance. The 50th percentile is typically a score of about 151; the 90th percentile is around 165 and the 99th is about 173. A 178 or better usually places the examinee in the 99.9th percentile.

Examinees have the option of canceling their scores within six calendar days after the exam, before they get their scores. LSAC still reports to law schools that the student registered for and took the exam, but releases no score. Test takers typically receive their scores online between three and four weeks after the exam. There is a formal appeals process for examinee complaints, which has been used for proctor misconduct, peer misconduct, and occasionally for challenging a question. In very rare instances, specific questions have been omitted from final scoring.

University of North Texas economist Michael Nieswiadomy has conducted several studies (in 1998, 2006, 2010, 2014, 2017, and 2024) derived from LSAC data. In the 2024 study, Nieswiadomy took the LSAC's categorization of test-takers in terms of their undergraduate college and university academic major study areas, and grouped a total of 154 major study areas into 30 categories, finding the averages of each major: The most recent study is “LSAT® Scores of Economics Majors: The 2022-23 Class Update and 7-Year History”. The Journal of Economic Education, 2024, 55(4): 1-6

1. Mathematics/Physics 164.3
2. Economics 161.7
3. Engineering 160.6
4. Computer science 160.4
5. Government/service 160.0
6. International relations 159.8
7. Chemistry 159.6
8. Philosophy Religion and Theology 159.4
9. History 159.0
10. Foreign languages 158.5
11. Arts 158.2
12. Biology/natural sciences 158.1
13. English 158.0
14. Social Sciences 157.9
15. Interdisciplinary studies 157.3
16. Finance 157.2
17. Anthropology/geography 157.1
18. Accounting 156.3
19. Liberal arts 155.9
20. Political science/Pre-law 155.6
21. Psychology 155.1
22. Communications/Journalism 154.8
23. Sociology/social work 153.9
24. Business management 153.9
25. Marketing 153.9
26. Health professions 153.8
27. Business administration 153.6
28. Education 153.1
29. Criminology 152.6
30. Criminal justice/Law enforcement 148.8

== Use of scores in law school admissions ==
The LSAT is considered an important part of the law school admissions process, along with GPA. Many law schools are selective in their decisions to admit students, and the LSAT is one method of differentiating candidates.

Additionally the LSAC says the LSAT (like the SAT and ACT at the undergraduate level) serves as a standardized measure of one's ability to succeed during law school. Undergraduate grade points can vary significantly due to choices in course load as well as grade inflation, which may be pervasive at an applicant's undergraduate institution, but almost nonexistent at that of another. Some law schools, such as Georgetown University and the University of Michigan have added programs designed to waive the LSAT for selected students who have maintained a 3.8 undergraduate GPA at their schools.

LSAC says its own research supports the use of the LSAT as a major factor in admissions, saying the median validity for LSAT alone is .41 (2001) and .40 (2002) in regard to the first year of law school. The correlation varies from school to school, and LSAC says that test scores are more strongly correlated to first year law school performance than is undergraduate GPA. LSAC says that a more strongly correlated single-factor measure does not currently exist, that GPA is difficult to use because it is influenced by the school and the courses taken by the student, and that the LSAT can serve as a yardstick of student ability because it is statistically normed. However, the American Bar Association has waived the requirement for law schools to use the LSAT as an admission requirement in select cases. This may be due to the fact that an emphasis on LSAT scores is considered by some to be detrimental to the promotion of diversity among applicants. Others argue that it is an attempt by law schools to counteract declining enrollment.

Most admission boards use an admission index, which is a formula that applies different weight to the LSAT and undergraduate GPA and adds the results. This composite statistic can have a weaker correlation to first year performance than either GPA or LSAT score alone, depending on the weighting used. The amount of weight assigned to LSAT score versus undergraduate GPA varies from school to school, as almost all law programs employ a different admission index formula.

=== GRE as an alternative to the LSAT ===
In February 2016, the University of Arizona James E. Rogers College of Law became the first law school to accept either the Graduate Record Examinations (GRE) or the Law School Admissions Test (LSAT) from all applicants. The law school made the decision after conducting a study showing that the GRE is a valid and reliable predictor of students' first-term law school grades.

In the spring of 2017, Harvard Law School announced it was joining University of Arizona Law in accepting the GRE in addition to the LSAT from applicants to its three-year J.D. program.

Since 2022, more than 100 of the 198 American Bar Association approved law schools accepted the GRE instead of the LSAT.

=== Multiple scores ===
Starting in September 2019, students may take the LSAT up to three times in a single LSAC year (1 June – 31 May), up to five times within the current and five past testing years (the period in which LSAC reports scores to law schools), and up to seven times over a lifetime. These restrictions will not apply retroactively; tests taken prior to September 2019 do not count toward a student's totals. Also, LSAC will implement an appeals process to grant exceptions to these restrictions under extenuating circumstances. Furthermore, starting in September 2019, no student who has obtained a perfect LSAT score of 180 within the current and five past testing years will be allowed to take the LSAT. This rule, unlike the other new rules, will be retroactive: a score of 180 obtained prior to September 2019 (but within the past five years) will preclude another attempt.

Between 2017 and July 2019, students could take the LSAT as many times as it was offered. Prior to 2017, only three attempts were allowed in a two-year period.

Every score within five years is reported to law schools during the application process, as well a separate average of all scores on record. When faced with multiple scores from repeat test takers, users of standardized assessments typically employ three indices—most recent, highest, and average scores—in order to summarize an individual’s related performance.

How the law schools report the LSAT scores of their matriculants to the American Bar Association (ABA) has changed over the years. In June 2006, the ABA revised a rule that mandated law schools to report their matriculants' average score if more than one test was taken. The current ABA rule now requires law schools to report only the highest LSAT score for matriculants who took the test more than once. In response, many law schools began considering only the highest LSAT score during the admissions process, as the highest score is an important factor in law school rankings such as those published by U.S. News & World Report. Many students rely heavily upon the rankings when deciding where to attend law school.

== Use of scores in admissions to intellectual clubs ==
High LSAT scores are accepted as qualifying evidence for intellectual clubs such as American Mensa, Intertel, the Triple Nine Society and the International Society for Philosophical Enquiry. The minimum scores they require depend on the selectivity of each society and time period when the test was administered. After 1982, Mensa has required students to score in the 95+ percentile rank on the LSAT for membership, while Intertel has required an LSAT score of 172 for admission since 1994, and Triple Nine has required an LSAT score of 173 for acceptance since 1991.

== Fingerprinting controversy ==
Starting October 1973, those taking the LSAT were required to have fingerprints taken, after some examinees were found to have hired impostors to take the test on their behalf.

A controversy surrounding the LSAT was the requirement that examinees submit to fingerprinting on the day of testing. Although LSAC does not store digital representations of fingerprints, there is a concern that fingerprints might be accessible by the U.S. Department of Homeland Security. At the behest of the Privacy Commissioner of Canada, the LSAC implemented a change as of September 2007 which exempts Canadian test takers from the requirement to provide a fingerprint and instead requires that Canadian test-takers provide a photograph. Starting with the June 2011 admission of the LSAT, LSAC expanded this policy to include test-takers in the United States and Caribbean; LSAC therefore no longer requires fingerprints from any test takers, and instead requires that they submit a photograph.

== LSAT─India ==
LSAC started administering the LSAT for Indian law schools in 2009. The test is administered twice a year by a person on behalf of LSAC. There are around 1300 law schools in India, however LSAT─India scores are accepted by only about 10-15 private law schools in the country. These scores are not accepted anywhere else in South Asia, and as a result participation in the LSAT─India has been low.

== In popular culture ==
In the 2001 film, Legally Blonde, the main character Elle Woods preps for the LSAT and scores a 179. This leads to her to attending Harvard Law School and graduating with high marks. Because of the film's success, Elle Woods' name has become synonymous with students who have had high scores.

== See also ==
- Association of American Law Schools
