= Miller Analogies Test =

Graduate school admissions test

- Acronym: MAT
- Type: Computer-based standardized test
- Administrator: Harcourt Assessment / Pearson Education
- Purpose: Graduate school admission in the United States
- Year started: 1940 (University of Minnesota); 1947 (The Psychological Corporation)
- Year terminated: 2023
- Duration: 60 minutes
- Score range: 200–600
- Offered: Multiple times per year
- Restrictions on attempts: 1 attempt every 12 months
- Regions: Canada; United States
- Languages: English
- Prerequisites: None
- Fee: Varies approx. US$70–100)
- Used by: Colleges and universities in the United States and Canada
- Website: www.milleranalogies.com

The Miller Analogies Test (MAT) was a standardized test used both for graduate school admissions in the United States and entrance to high I.Q. societies. Created and published by Harcourt Assessment (now a division of Pearson Education), the MAT consisted of 120 questions in 60 minutes (an earlier iteration was 100 questions in 50 minutes). The test was discontinued in 2023, with the last tests administered on or before November 15, 2023.

== Content and use ==
The test aimed to measure an individual's logical and analytical reasoning through the use of partial analogies. A sample test question might have been:

Bach : Composing :: Monet :

- a. painting
- b. composing
- c. writing
- d. orating

This should be read as "Bach is to (:) Composing as (::) Monet is to (:) _______." The answer would be a. painting because just as Bach is most known for composing music, Monet is most known for his painting. The open slot may appear in any of the four positions.

Unlike analogies found on past editions of the GRE and the SAT, the MAT's analogies demanded a broad knowledge of Western culture, testing subjects such as science, music, literature, philosophy, mathematics, art, and history. Thus, exemplary success on the MAT required more than a nuanced and cultivated vocabulary.

== Format and scoring ==
In the fall of 2004, the exam became computerized.

Out of the 120 questions, only 100 counted in the test-taker's score. The remaining 20 questions were experimental. There was no way for test-takers to identify any of the 20 experimental questions on a given test form, as the two types of questions are intermingled.

Tests taken before October 2004 were scored simply by the number of questions the test-taker answered correctly, with a range from 0–100. Scores using this metric have historically been known as raw scores.

Tests taken in October 2004 or later had a score range from 200 to 600. The median score was 400, with a standard deviation of 25 points. These scores, based on a normal curve, are known as scaled scores. Because of their grounding in this model, scaled MAT scores of 500-600 were extremely rare, as they would have been more than four standard deviations above the norm of 400.

Percentile ranks were also provided along with the official score report. Test-takers received an overall percentile rank as well as a percentile rank within their intended graduate school discipline.

The Miller Analogies Test used to be accepted by American Mensa, and still is by Intertel, the Triple Nine Society, the International Society for Philosophical Enquiry and the Prometheus Society for its admission requirements. Intertel requires a raw score of 74 on the "old" MAT, or a score at the 99th percentile on the modern one. The ISPE and the Triple Nine Society require at least a raw score of 85 on the "old" MAT, and at least 472 on the modern one. The Prometheus Society requires at least a raw score of 98 on the "old" MAT, and at least 500 on the modern one.

== Validity ==
Kuncel and colleagues investigated the predictive validity of the MAT in both academic and occupational settings. Their meta-analytic study indicated that the MAT is a valid predictor in both domains and that it measures the same abilities as other cognitive ability instruments. Selected validity coefficients from the study are presented in the table below.

Meta-analytic validity coefficients of the MAT for various outcomes. r is the sample size weighted average correlation, while ρ represents estimated true score validity after correction for certain statistical artifacts (see Kuncel et al. 2004 for details).
| Criterion | r | ρ |
|---|---|---|
| Graduate Record Examination—Verbal | 0.70 | 0.88 |
| Graduate Record Examination—Quantitative | 0.42 | 0.57 |
| General ability and reasoning measures | 0.56 | 0.75 |
| Graduate grade point average | 0.27 | 0.39 |
| Faculty ratings | 0.25 | 0.37 |
| Research productivity | 0.13 | 0.19 |
| Time to finish degree | 0.25 | 0.35 |
| Internship/practicum ratings | 0.13 | 0.22 |
| Ratings of creativity | 0.25 | 0.36 |
| Job performance | 0.26 | 0.41 |

== Criticism ==
According to Kaplan & Saccuzo, the Miller Analogies Test is age-biased. The scores over-predict the GPAs (Grade Point Average) of people ages 25 to 34 and achievement for people 45 and older, and under-predict the GPAs of people 35 to 44. The test has also been criticized for culturally loaded references.

== See also ==
- Entrance examination
- Graduate Record Examination
