= Susan Nigro =

American musician

Susan L. Nigro (born 1951) is an American contrabassoonist. Unlike most players of the instrument, Nigro's career is primarily as a solo recitalist and recording artist rather than an orchestral player.

== Life ==
Nigro is a native of Chicago. She is an alumna of Northwestern University and Roosevelt University. Her instructors included Burl Lane and Wilbur Simpson. She is a member of several high-IQ societies, including Mensa and Intertel.

== Career ==
Her repertoire includes the Gunther Schuller, Frank E. Warren and Daniel Dorff concertos for contrabassoon, as well as the Stamitz and Mozart concertos originally written for the bassoon. Nigro has premiered over 30 works since 1988, most of which were commissioned by her. She has given more premieres than any other contrabassoonist.

She has appeared as a soloist with such groups as the Chicago Chamber Orchestra, Rome Festival Orchestra, and the Mozarteum Orchestra of Salzburg, as well as at multiple International Double Reed Society conferences. She has also performed as a recitalist and given masterclasses at dozens of universities and music festivals.

In addition to her recording and recital careers, Nigro was the full-time substitute for the Chicago Symphony Orchestra during the 2005–2006 season and again during the 2008-2010 season. She was also a guest artist with the Northwest Symphony. She was among the founders of the Chicago Bassoon Quartet and the contrabassoon duo The Two Contras.

She won a Pro Musicis International Career Development Grant, and Illinois Arts Council grant.

== Recordings ==
- The Big Bassoon
- Little Tunes for the Big Bassoon
- The 2 Contras, with Burl Lane
- The Bass Nightingale, GM 2069
- New Tunes for the Big Bassoon
- Bellissima: Italian Tunes for the Big Bassoon
- Original Tunes for the Big Bassoon
- Scott Joplin Rags for the Big Bassoon
