= Asia Carrera =

American pornographic film actress (born 1972/1973)

- Carrera in 2003
- Born: 1972 or 1973 (age 52–53); New York City, U.S.
- Other names: Jessica Steinhauser; Asia Lemmon
- Education: Utah Tech University (BS); Texas A&M University (MSEd); St. Mary's University (JD)
- Occupations: Pornographic film actress; attorney
- Spouse: Don Lemmon (m. 2003; died 2006)
- Website: asiacarrera.com

Jessica Steinhauser (born 1972 or 1973), also known as Asia Lemmon and formerly as Asia Carrera, is an American former pornographic film actress and attorney.

== Early life ==
Carrera was born in New York City to a German mother and Japanese father, the oldest of four siblings. She was raised in Little Silver, New Jersey, and attended Red Bank Regional High School. At the age of 16, she taught English at Tsuruga College in Tsuruga, Fukui, Japan.

At 17 years old, Carrera ran away from home due to overwhelming parental pressures and attempted suicide several times. She received a full scholarship to Rutgers University, but dropped out after realizing she could make large sums of money dancing and modeling. Soon after leaving Rutgers, she moved to Los Angeles.

== Acting career ==
=== Adult film career ===
Carrera has appeared in over 350 adult films. In 1995, she became the first Asian performer ever to win the AVN Female Performer of the Year Award.

Carrera lent her voice to several erotic hentai OVAs for publisher Pink Pineapple, such as Inmu (2001) and Shusaku (1999). In October 2001, Carrera attended the Big Apple Anime Fest in New York City for her voice roles and, along with Kobe Tai, was an Opening Night Guest of Honor at the fest's Midnight Anime Concourse.

Carrera was featured in the 2012 documentary After Porn Ends, which documents the lives of actors after they leave the adult film industry. In the documentary, she discusses her membership in Mensa. Despite being a celebrity member of the group, the organization refused to link to her website because it contained pornographic elements.

=== Other work ===
In 1998, she appeared in an uncredited cameo role in the film The Big Lebowski in the faux pornographic movie Logjammin' within the film.

Carrera was a guest reviewer for Maximum PC magazine.

== Post-acting work ==
In 2015, Carrera began studies at Utah Tech University, where she was joined two years later by her 11-year-old daughter. At that time, Carrera's daughter was the youngest student to attend college at Utah Tech, and the youngest full-time college student in the state of Utah.

Carrera has a Bachelor of Science in psychology from Utah Tech, a Master of Education from Texas A&M University, and a Doctor of Jurisprudence from St. Mary's University School of Law. In April 2026, she passed the State of Texas bar exam, and in July 2026, reported that she had worked her first day at court in San Antonio.

== Personal life ==
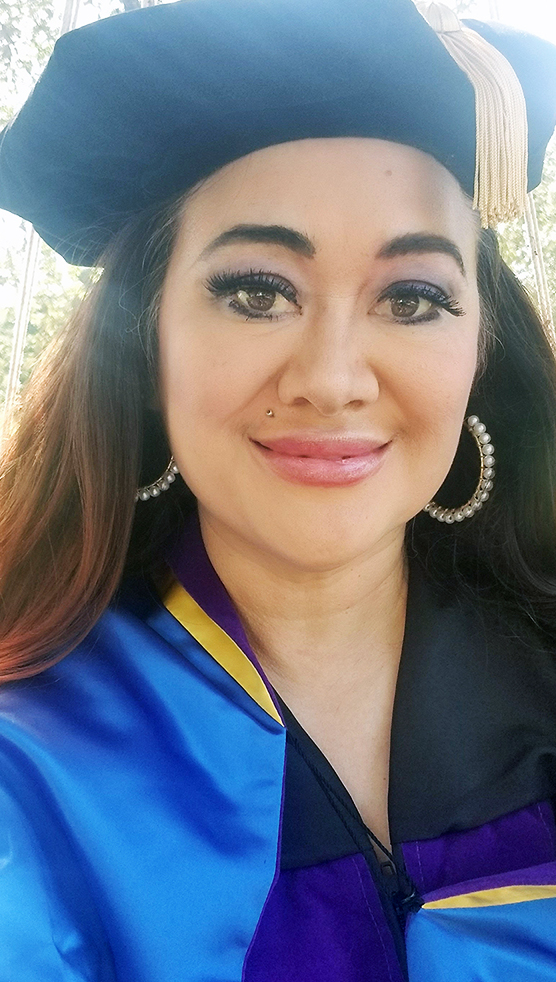
Carrera after receiving her Doctor of Jurisprudence degree from St. Mary's University School of Law, May 2024

Carrera is an atheist. In November 2014, she wore a colander on her head for her Utah driver's license photograph. State law normally prohibits the wearing of hats in driver license photos, but there is an exception for religious headwear and Carerra's colander was worn in honor of the religion of the Flying Spaghetti Monster. She is one of about a dozen "Pastafarian" Utahns who have worn a colander in their official state ID photos.

She married nutritionist and author Don Lemmon on December 19, 2003. The couple moved to St. George, Utah, where she gave birth to a daughter on March 4, 2005. On June 10, 2006, Lemmon was killed in a car accident outside of Las Vegas. Seven weeks later, on July 31, Carrera gave birth to the couple's second child. In June 2012, she gave birth to a boy whom she later placed for adoption.

In 2015, she was arrested for DUI with "a reported blood alcohol content of .254 percent – more than three times Utah's .08 legal limit." She pleaded no contest in exchange for avoiding jail time and was sentenced to house arrest.

Carrera is a member of Mensa, with an IQ of 156. She has stated that she has autism, attention deficit hyperactivity disorder, and anxiety.

== Awards and nominations ==
- 1995 AVN Female Performer of the Year
- 2000 AVN Best Couples Sex Scene – Film (Search for the Snow Leopard)
- 2000 AVN Award nominee - Best Actress – Film
- 2001 AVN Hall of Fame inductee
- 2007 XRCO Hall of Fame inductee – XRCO Members' Choice
