= Logic game (disambiguation) =

A logic game, also known as a logic puzzle, is a puzzle deriving from the mathematical field of deduction.

Logic game may also refer to:

- LSAT logic games, a section of the LSAT
- a game-theoretical device for defining the semantics of a logic; see game semantics
- a logic-based game; a video game programmed using transistor–transistor logic
