= Wilbur Simpson =

American musician

Wilbur H. Simpson (December 6, 1917, in Angola, Indiana – June 17, 1997, in Platte Lake, Michigan) was an American classical bassoonist and pedagogue.

At Northwestern University, he studied with Hugo Fox, principal bassoonist of the Chicago Symphony Orchestra.

During World War II, he served in the navy aboard the battleship USS West Virginia (BB-48). He was in the Navy Band that played aboard the USS Missouri (BB-63) during the Japanese Surrender.

In 1946, he joined the Chicago Symphony Orchestra, first as contrabassoonist, then as second bassoon, where he remained until his retirement in the fall of 1991. He was awarded the Theodore Thomas Medal for his service to the CSO. He was an original member of the Chicago Symphony Woodwind Quintet, and later the Chicago Symphony Winds, which played throughout the United States and abroad.

He was featured in a segment of the WNIB radio series marking the 100th anniversary of the CSO during 1990–91, along with Adrian Da Prato, a violinist who also had joined the orchestra in 1946. They were the two senior members of the orchestra.

Well known as a teacher, he served as Professor of Bassoon at Northwestern University, and taught at DePaul University and the Chicago Conservatory College. Many of his former pupils now occupy positions in leading orchestras of the world. Among his students was Susan Nigro.
