= Cícero Moraes =

Brazilian 3D designer

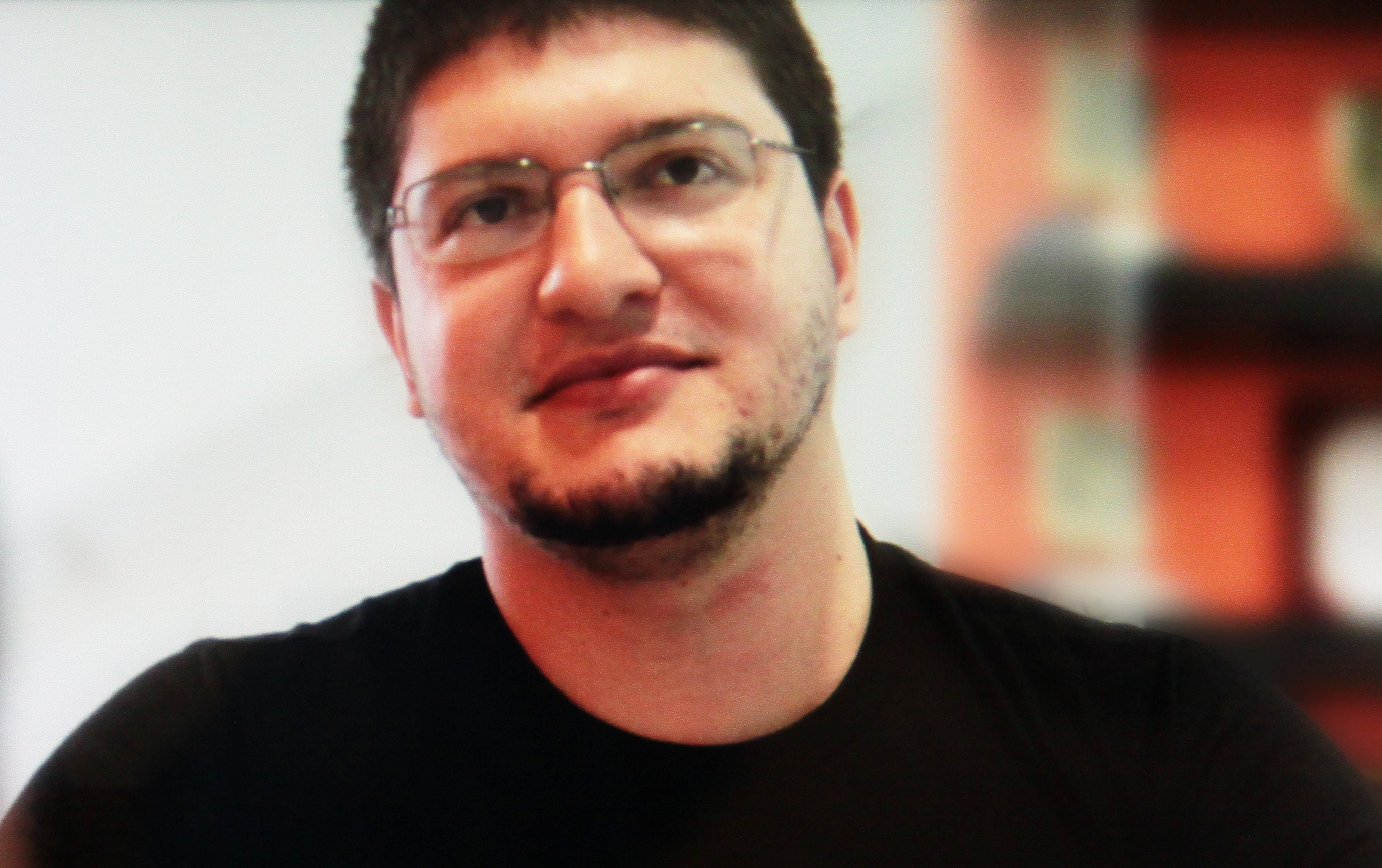
- Born: Cícero André da Costa Moraes; 13 November 1982 (age 43); Chapecó, Brazil
- Occupation: 3D Designer
- Website: http://www.ciceromoraes.com.br

Cícero Moraes is a Brazilian 3D designer and researcher who has digitally reconstructed the faces of some historical figures.

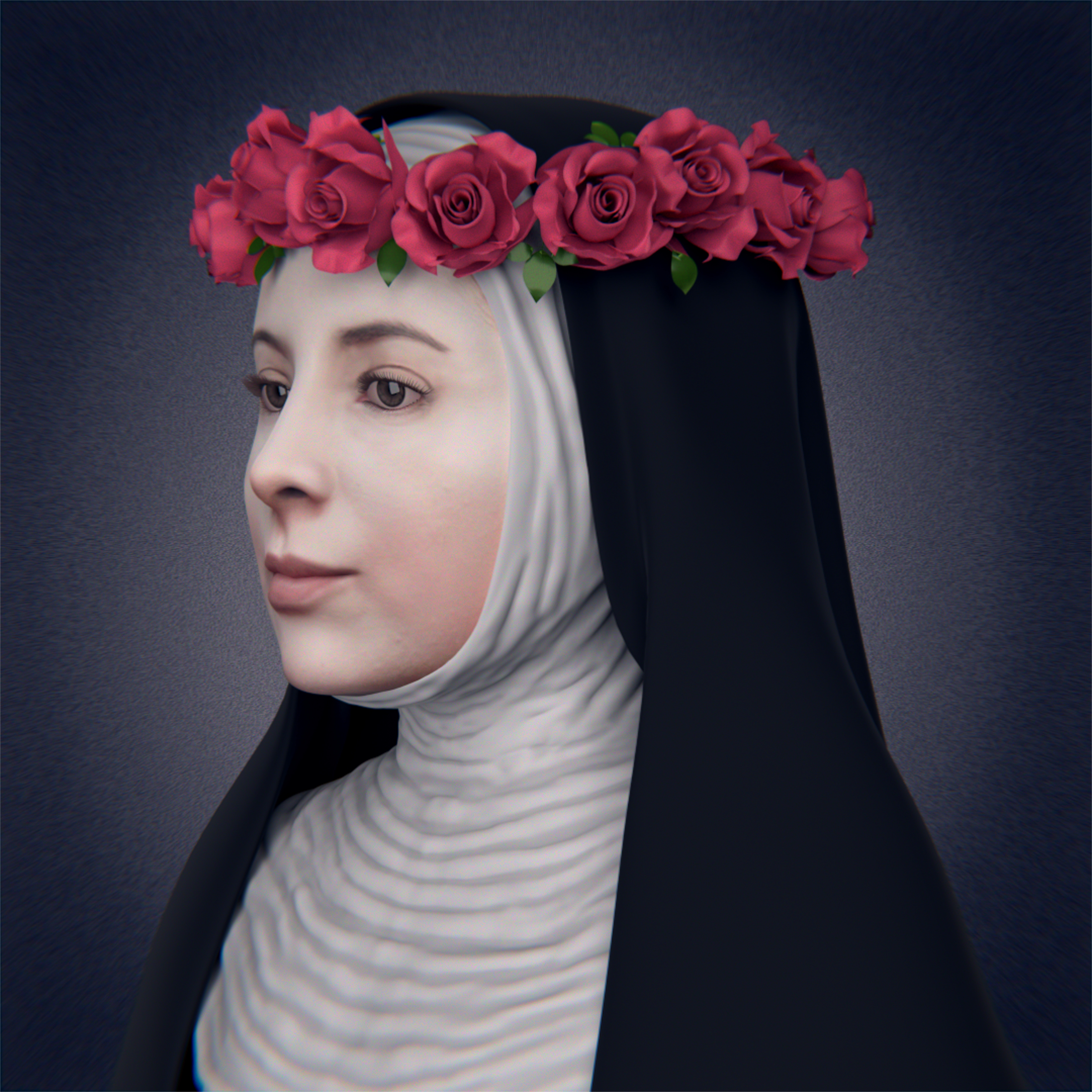
Rose of Lima - facial reconstruction

== Biography ==
Moraes' best-known work is the facial reconstruction of St. Anthony of Padua, performed in partnership with the Centro Studi Antoniani (which works inside the Basilica of Saint Anthony of Padua), the Museum of Anthropology at the University of Padua, the Technology Center Renato Archer and the archaeological research group Arc-Team.

In 2013, he created 12 panels on facial reconstruction related to human evolution. These panels were presented in the exhibition "Faces of Evolution" at the Egyptian and Rosicrucian Museum in Curitiba, Brazil. All images displayed in the exhibition were donated to the Wikimedia Commons and were used to illustrate online posts related to scientific publications.

In partnership with Rodolfo Melani and Paulo Eduardo Miamoto Dias at the Faculty of Dentistry at the University of São Paulo, Moraes wrote an article describing scanning techniques and facial reconstruction using only free software, and also participated in publications which describe the conversion of a video into a CT scan, presented at an international conference on computer graphics in Portugal. The partnership with Dias earned him two awards for best scientific poster at events of forensic dentistry and forensic anthropology at national and international level.

In February 2015, he performed 27 facial reconstructions, of which 22 were related to human evolution and 5 were related to historic people of the city of Padua. The reconstructions were presented at the exhibit "FACCE - i molti volti della storia umana" (FACES. The Many Visages of Human History), organized by the Museum of Anthropology at the University of Padova, Arc-Team, and the Association of Anthropologists Antrocom Onlus. Besides St. Anthony's facial reconstruction, Moraes also reconstructed the historic faces of poet Francesco Petrarca, devotee Luca Belludi, and scientist Giovanni Battista Morgagni.

Moraes was one of the main members of the Ebrafol, Brazilian Team of Forensic Anthropology and Odontology that reconstructed the face of Rose of Lima and Martin of Porres, in Peru. The designer worked in other projects of facial reconstruction with the Catholic Church.

On the Animal Avengers group, Moraes developed animal prosthetic based on 3D-printed technology. This prevented a variety of animals from having to be euthanized, such as a goose, a toucan, an aracari, and a macaw.

Moraes was responsible for the reconstruction of the skull and the face of Lord of Sipan, an ancient Moche leader, in Peru. A few months later, he reconstructed the face of the Czech "vampire" of Celakovice.

In an associated project with the Brazilian Academy of Hagiology, Moraes reconstructed the face of Saint Valentine, presented to the public on 13 February 2017. Moraes, along with a team of researchers at Universiti Sains Malaysia, assisted in the facial reconstruction of Perak Man in 2021.

He joined Intertel and Mensa as a member in 2023.
