= Retuinskih's System ROSS =

Martial system

Retuinskih System ROSS (Russian: РОСС, short for Росси́йская Оте́чественная Систе́ма Самозащи́ты; English transliteration: Rossiyskaya Otechestvennaya Sistema Samozashchity; translated as Russian Native System of Self-Defense) is a martial system trademarked by Alexander Retuinskih related to Systema. ROSS is its official name given by the All-Russian Federation of Russian Martial Arts (RFRMA). It is conceived more as a methodology of performance enhancement for combat, applicable to any martial art, rather than a closed system.

Retuinskih's experience includes being a USSR boxing and Combat Sambo champion, and a Sambo and judo Master of Sports champion, as well as being the partner to Alexey Kadochnikov in Kadochnikov's Systema until their separation in 1991.

In 1991, Alexander Retuinskih patented Rossijskaya Otechestvennaya Systema Samozashchity or in acronym, R.O.S.S., "Russian Native System of Self-defense." ... The ROSS educational system was patented as "Know-How" (registered with the State enterprise "Informpatent" Committee of the Russian Federation by patent and trademark of April 4, 1991).

Russian Martial Art R.O.S.S. gained its first appearance and proliferation due to the efforts of USA National Sambo Team Coach and Champion Scott Sonnon, most notably in the 1999 Special "Russian Martial Arts" Edition issue of World of Martial Arts Magazine

In 2007, Alexander Retuinskih was voted one of the "100 Most Influential People in Russia".
