= Intertel =

Second-oldest high-IQ society in the world

- Formation: 23 November 1966
- Founder: Ralph B. Haines
- Type: High IQ society
- Members: 1,700+
- Official language: English
- Website: intertel-iq.org

Intertel is a high-IQ society founded in 1966 that is open to those who have scored at or above the 99th percentile, or the top one percent, on a standardized test of intelligence. It has been identified as one of the notable high-IQ societies established since the late 1960s with admissions requirements that are stricter and more exclusive than Mensa.

== History ==
Intertel is open to those who have scored at or above the 99th percentile, or the top one percent, on a standardized test of intelligence. It has been identified as one of the notable high-IQ societies established since the late 1960s with admissions requirements that are stricter and more exclusive than Mensa. Statistical research validates the robustness of Intertel’s admissions criteria to correctly identify IQ at the 99th percentile, while raising questions about whether it is possible for high-IQ societies to accurately measure intelligence beyond this percentile threshold.

Intertel was founded in 1966 by Ralph Haines, following the Mensa founders Roland Berrill and Lancelot Ware, who wanted to create an association adapted to the gifted needs without any specific restriction of admission (with the exception of a minimum IQ). Intertel thus became the second-oldest organization of this kind, Mensa being the first.

Intertel members are divided into eight regions, as of 2026: Six regions only cover the U.S. and Canada, one region covers South America, and one "International" region covers the rest of the world.

== Organization and activities ==
Aligned with one of the goals stated in its constitution, Intertel's members participate in research on high intelligence.

In 1978, Intertel established the "Hollingworth Award" in memory of psychologist Leta Stetter Hollingworth, who specialized in research on gifted children. This award was annually presented until at least 1993, first sponsored by Intertel and then the Intertel Foundation.

== Notable past and current members ==
- Ronald K. Hoeflin – American philosopher
- Taibi Kahler – American clinical psychologist and author
- Grover Krantz – American biological anthropologist and cryptozoologist (1931–2002)
- Gert Mittring – German mental calculator (born 1966)
- Ellen Muth – American actress (born 1981)
- Susan Nigro – American musician
- Robert Prechter – American financial author and analyst
- Ginny Ruffner – American glass artist (1952–2025)
- E. Lee Spence – Underwater archaeologist
- Cícero Moraes – Brazilian 3D designer

== See also ==
- Mensa International, high-IQ society above the 98th percentile
- Triple Nine Society, high-IQ society above the 99.9th percentile
