= Pre-law =

Undergrad courses for law

In the United States and Canada, pre-law (or prelaw) refers to preparation taken by an undergraduate student for applying to law school.

The American Bar Association (ABA) requires law schools to admit only students with an accredited bachelor's degree or its equivalent depending on the student's country of origin. However, there are no specific "pre-law" degree or majors, and unlike pre-med, an undergraduate student seeking legal education in the United States is not required to take a set of prerequisites in order to apply. Hence, most undergraduate institutions do not offer an official "pre-law" concentration, and in some cases provide somewhat equivalents such as "Law, Society and Justice" instead. Students awarded with Bachelor of Arts, Bachelor of Science or equivalent degrees (and more rarely, higher degrees such as the master's degree and doctorate) may apply for law schools as long as they meet specific admission requirements set forth by individual law schools, as well as the standard requirements (such as character and fitness) as set forth by the ABA and the Law School Admission Council.

In 2001, the five most common majors of students entering law school were political science, history, English, psychology, and criminal justice. The five majors with the highest acceptance rates were physics, philosophy, biology, chemistry, and government (or government service), which is a political science degree with an applied emphasis in public policy and public administration most commonly geared towards those pursuing a career in civil service or the nonprofit sector.

A pre-law program is sometimes offered at some American colleges and universities.
