= Triple Nine Society =

High IQ society

- Formation: 1978
- Founder: Richard Canty, Ronald Hoeflin, Kevin Langdon, Ronald Penner, Edgar Van Vleck
- Type: High IQ society
- Tax ID no.: 27-5473103
- Members: > 2,000
- Official language: English
- Regent: Kathryn Holopainen
- Website: triplenine.org

The Triple Nine Society (TNS) is an international high-IQ society for adults whose score on a standardized test demonstrates an IQ at or above the 99.9th percentile of the human population. The society recognizes scores from over 20 intelligence and academic aptitude tests. TNS was founded in 1978, and, as of 2026, reports a member base of over 2,000 people in 53 US jurisdictions and 39 countries. Since 2010, the organization has been a non-profit 501(c)(7) organization incorporated in Virginia, USA.

== Organization ==
The society was founded by Richard Canty, Ronald Hoeflin, Kevin Langdon, Ronald Penner, and Edgar Van Vleck, as a split-off of the ISPE, a similarly selective high-IQ society, with whose governance structure they were dissatisfied.

TNS is led by a "Regent" and served by an Executive Committee consisting of the Regent and eight further officers, all of whom are elected for two-year terms.

In 2015, TNS established a 501(c)(3) subsidiary charitable organization, the Triple Nine Society Foundation, to provide scholarships to intellectually gifted students pursuing higher-education goals and for other charitable work.

== Communication ==
TNS publishes a bimonthly journal, Vidya, which contains articles, poetry, puzzles, and other creative content contributed by members conversant with a variety of subjects, as well as officer reports and other official business of the Society.

TNS members mostly communicate online on the official TNS Discourse forum, official TNS Facebook group, and a variety of unofficial venues ranging from Discord to Telegram and special groups like TNS Youth and TNS LGBTQ+.

Every autumn, the society organizes an annual meeting in the United States called ggg999, with "ggg" referring to "Global General Gathering". A privately organized European gathering, egg, usually takes place in late spring.

== Qualifying test scores ==
To qualify for membership, an applicant must submit a qualifying score earned on any of the standardized tests recognized by the society; these include IQ tests as well as various college admission exams and military classification tests.

For IQ tests, a qualifying score corresponds to an IQ of at least 146 for tests with standard deviation of 15 (e.g., WAIS, Stanford–Binet 5), at least 149 for tests with a standard deviation of 16 (e.g., Stanford–Binet IV and CTMM), or at least 173 for tests with a standard deviation of 24 (e.g., Cattell III-B).

The American Mensa test, the Reynolds Adaptable Intelligence Test (RAIT), is accepted with the Total Battery Intelligence Index of 146 and above.

TNS also accepts standardized test scores including SAT, GRE, GMAT, LSAT, ACT, and the Miller Analogies Test. Required score will differ depending on the year those tests were taken.

== Notable members ==
- Robert Forster (1941–2019) — actor
- Mike Keefe (born 1946) — American editorial cartoonist
- Andrew Koenig (born 1952) — computer programmer
- Henry "Hammerin' Hank" Milligan (born 1958) — American retired professional boxer
- Andrew York (born 1958) — American classical guitarist and composer

== See also ==
- Mensa, high-IQ society above the 98th percentile
- Intertel, high-IQ society above the 99th percentile
