= Ronald K. Hoeflin =

American philosopher

- Born: February 23, 1944 (age 82); Ochlocknee, Georgia, U.S.
- Education: The New School (PhD)
- Parent(s): William Eugene Hoeflin; Mary Elizabeth Dell

Ronald K. Hoeflin (born February 23, 1944) is an American librarian by profession, philosopher and amateur psychometrician. He is the creator of the Mega and Titan tests, which he claims can measure extremely high IQ values.

== Biography ==
Hoeflin was born on February 23, 1944, in Ochlocknee, Georgia to William Eugene Hoeflin and Mary Elizabeth Dell Hoeflin. Hoeflin grew up in St Louis, Missouri.

Hoeflin stated in an interview that his goal was "to make a living publishing journals for high-IQ societies." He began his work in this field as editor for the Triple Nine Society in 1979.

In 1987 he earned a Ph.D. from the New School for Social Research, the graduate division of The New School, with a thesis titled "The Root-metaphor theory: A critical appraisal of Stephen C. Pepper's theory of metaphysics through an analysis of its interpretation of the concepts of truth, beauty, and goodness."

In 1988, Hoeflin won the American Philosophical Association's Rockefeller Prize "for the best unpublished, article-length work in philosophy by a non-academically affiliated philosopher in a given year." This was awarded for his article, Theories of Truth: A Comprehensive Synthesis. His article argues for the interrelated nature of seven leading theories of truth.

For over a decade, he worked on a thirteen-volume treatise titled "The Encyclopedia of Categories", which was published in 2020 online and is available to download for free.

== Intelligence tests and societies ==
Ronald Hoeflin has been a member of various high IQ societies, including Mensa and Intertel. He cofounded the Triple Nine Society in 1978, and founded the Mega Society in 1982. He claims an IQ of 164, stating his scores have ranged from 125 to 175, depending upon the cognitive abilities tapped into.

Hoeflin attempted, along with Kevin Langdon, to develop an IQ test that could measure adult IQs greater than three standard deviations from the population median, or IQ 145 (sd 15). Hoeflin's Mega Test was an unsupervised test without time limit consisting of 48 questions, half verbal and half mathematical. It was published in then science-fiction Omni magazine, in April 1985, and the results were used to norm the test. Hoeflin standardized the test six times, using equipercentile equating with SAT and other scores, and some extrapolation at the highest level.

The Mega Test differed from conventional standardized intelligence tests in that it was unsupervised and untimed. Roger D. Carlson's evaluation in Test Critiques stated that the test "violates many good psychometric principles by overinterpreting the weak data of a self-selected sample." Other scholars have cautioned that norm tables for extreme IQ values often rely on extrapolation rather than representative empirical samples.

The Mega Test, among other IQ tests, has been criticised for blurring specific domain knowledge with generalised intelligence, although "most psychologists can agree that [standard IQ tests] measure something valuable." For over sixty years, psychologists such as Leta Stetter Hollingworth, author of the book Children Above 180 IQ, have suggested that people with extremely high IQs are radically different from the general population. Identifying such people would require IQ tests with reliability not currently available for extreme ranges of IQ.

The test's attempt to measure high IQ at the tail of the normal distribution has been academically evaluated. Although it is an innovative attempt to create a test that would evaluate very high IQ, the nature of the test - self administered without time limit - which was chosen for pragmatic reasons, would not necessarily measure general intelligence, but could measure resourcefulness or some other factor. The frequent renorming of the test by its author was non standard but also innovative. Nevertheless, it contained well known statistical flaws, such as sample self selection. The analysis could not therefore validate the conclusions. Attempts to eke out discrimination at the hundredth or thousandth percentile were clearly overwhelmed by the test's standard error, given that there were only 48 questions. The questions, too, were criticised for being structured with insufficient sensitivity to the detection of knowledge, because of the question format used. The test was thus described as not so much number crunching as "nothing short of number pulverisation".

A 2020 analysis by David Redvaldsen of Hoeflin's Mega and Titan tests concluded that the official scores reported to test-takers were too high.

In 1990, Hoeflin created the Titan Test, also published in Omni.

=== Societies Founded by Ronald Hoeflin ===
Believing that people at the highest IQ levels would be able easily to communicate with each other and have much in common, Hoeflin founded several societies for those with the highest scores. These societies are (along with year founded, percentile, and minimum IQ (sd 16)):

Society	Year founded	Acceptance Percentile	Acceptance IQ (SD 16)	Number of Members
Top One Percent Society	1989	99	137	
Triple Nine Society	1978	99.9	149	>2000
One-in-a-Thousand Society	1992	99.9	150	
Prometheus Society	1982	99.997	164	100
Epimetheus Society	2006	99.997	164	150
Mega Society	1982	99.9999	176	26 (in 1985)
Omega Society	2006	99.9999	176	
