= LSAT logic games =

LSAT question type

Diagram of the basic linear question presented below.

LSAT logic games, abbreviated LG, and officially referred to as analytical reasoning, was historically one of three types of sections that appeared on the Law School Admission Test (LSAT) before August 2024. A logic games section contained four 5–8 question "games", totaling 22–25 questions. Each game contained a scenario and a set of rules that govern the scenario, followed by questions that tested the test-taker's ability to understand and apply the rules, to draw inferences based on them. In the words of the Law School Admission Council (LSAC), which administers the test, it "measure[d] the ability to understand a structure of relationships and to draw logical conclusions about that structure". What made the games challenging was that the rules were never fully complete, meaning that an examinee could never identify a single "correct" set of relationships among all elements of a game. Rather, the point was to test the examinee on their ability to analyze the range of possibilities arising from an incomplete set of rules. Individual questions often added rules or modified existing rules, requiring quick reorganization of known information.

Like all other sections on the LSAT, the time allowed for the section was 35 minutes. Most students found the logic games section to be the most difficult and intimidating portion of the LSAT. For example, the For Dummies series published a book specifically devoted to LSAT logic games, in addition to its more general book about the entire LSAT. What made the logic games so hard was that they were designed as tests of pure deductive reasoning, a skill which few people specifically study or develop in school. However, the section was widely considered the easiest and fastest to improve at once the right strategies were learned and employed.

The dominant pedagogical method in American law schools is the combination of the Socratic method with the casebook method. As part of this method, a law professor will often call upon a law student and ask them to identify the specific legal rules articulated by the court in a particular reported case. The law professor will then describe various hypothetical scenarios, adding or changing various facts, and ask if the same rules apply or if the outcome of the case may be different under different facts. The logic games section was supposed to test this ability to rapidly analyze hypothetical scenarios or "hypotheticals", and to do so in a way that was independent of students' substantive knowledge and undergraduate major.

In 2019 the LSAC reached a legal settlement with two blind LSAT test takers who claimed that it violated the Americans with Disabilities Act because they were unfairly penalized for not being able to draw the diagrams commonly used to solve the questions in the section. As part of the settlement, the LSAC agreed to review and overhaul the section within four years. In October 2023, it announced that the section would be replaced by a second logical reasoning section in August 2024.

== Common game types ==
=== Basic linear ===
In a basic linear game, two sets of variables are provided. The first set of variables, sometimes referred to as the 'base variables,' is often days of the week, an order of arrival, or some other order. The second variable set is then matched to the first set according to a set of rules. For example:

Eight runners, F, G, H, I, J, K, L and M, are running a marathon. The runners arrive at the finish line one at a time. The following facts are known about the runners' order of arrival.

F does not arrive first or last.

H arrives either immediately before or immediately after K.

If G arrives before H, G also arrives before I.

M arrives fifth.

After setting the scenario, the game challenges the test-taker with questions such as:

If F arrives at the finish line second, and H third, which one of the following runners cannot arrive at the finish line first:

a. J

b. K

c. L

d. G

e. I

=== Advanced linear ===
Advanced linear games are similar to basic linear games, but three or more sets of variables are presented. For example:

Seven runners, F, G, H, I, J, K and L, are running a marathon. Each runner wears a shirt that is blue, red, yellow or purple. No runner's shirt has more than one color. The runners arrive at the finish line one at a time.

The game can then provide rules and pose questions relating to the order of arrival of a runner, the color of a specific runner's shirt, sequences of color that must or must not be present, the shirt color of the runner that comes first etc.

=== Grouping ===
Grouping games provide variables that must be assigned to groups, but not in a specific order or sequence. For example:

Eight soccer players, Q, R, S, T, U, V, W and X, must each be assigned to one of two groups, group 1 and group 2. No more than five players are assigned to one group.

T and U may not be in the same group.

If S and V are assigned to the same group, X is also assigned to that group.

=== Grouping linear combinations ===
Combination games follow a similar structure but include both linear and grouping elements.

== Less common game types ==
In addition to the common games, the LSAT sometimes included other types of games that appeared less frequently. Examples of less common games were:

- Mapping – Distribution of marks or landmarks on a map.
- Pure sequencing – A variation on the basic linear games, but no placement rules are given, only sequencing rules.
- Circular linearity – Similar to linear games, but the variables are placed in a circle rather than a straight line, thus allowing spatial relationships in addition to the neighboring relationships.
- Pattern – A variation on the advanced linear games, but no placement rules are given, only pattern rules.

== Method ==
To solve games quickly and efficiently, test-takers usually drew a master diagram at the bottom of the page. The rules and key inferences were written down in short symbols next to the diagram, and, where possible, marked on the diagram itself. A smaller diagram could also be drawn next to a specific question if that question posed any additional rules. On some games, it was helpful to create separate diagrams of all the possibilities and then use that to tackle questions.

== See also ==
- Puzzle
- Process of elimination
