= History of the SAT =

The SAT is a standardized test commonly used for the purpose of admission to colleges and universities in the United States. The test, owned by the College Board and originally developed by Carl Brigham, was first administered on June 23, 1926, to about 8,000 students. The test was introduced as a supplement to the College Board essay exams already in use for college admissions, but ease of administration of the SAT and other factors led to the discontinuation of the essay exams during World War II. The SAT has since gone through numerous changes in content, duration, scoring, and name; the test was taken by more than 1.97 million students in the graduating high school class of 2024.

== Origins and overview ==
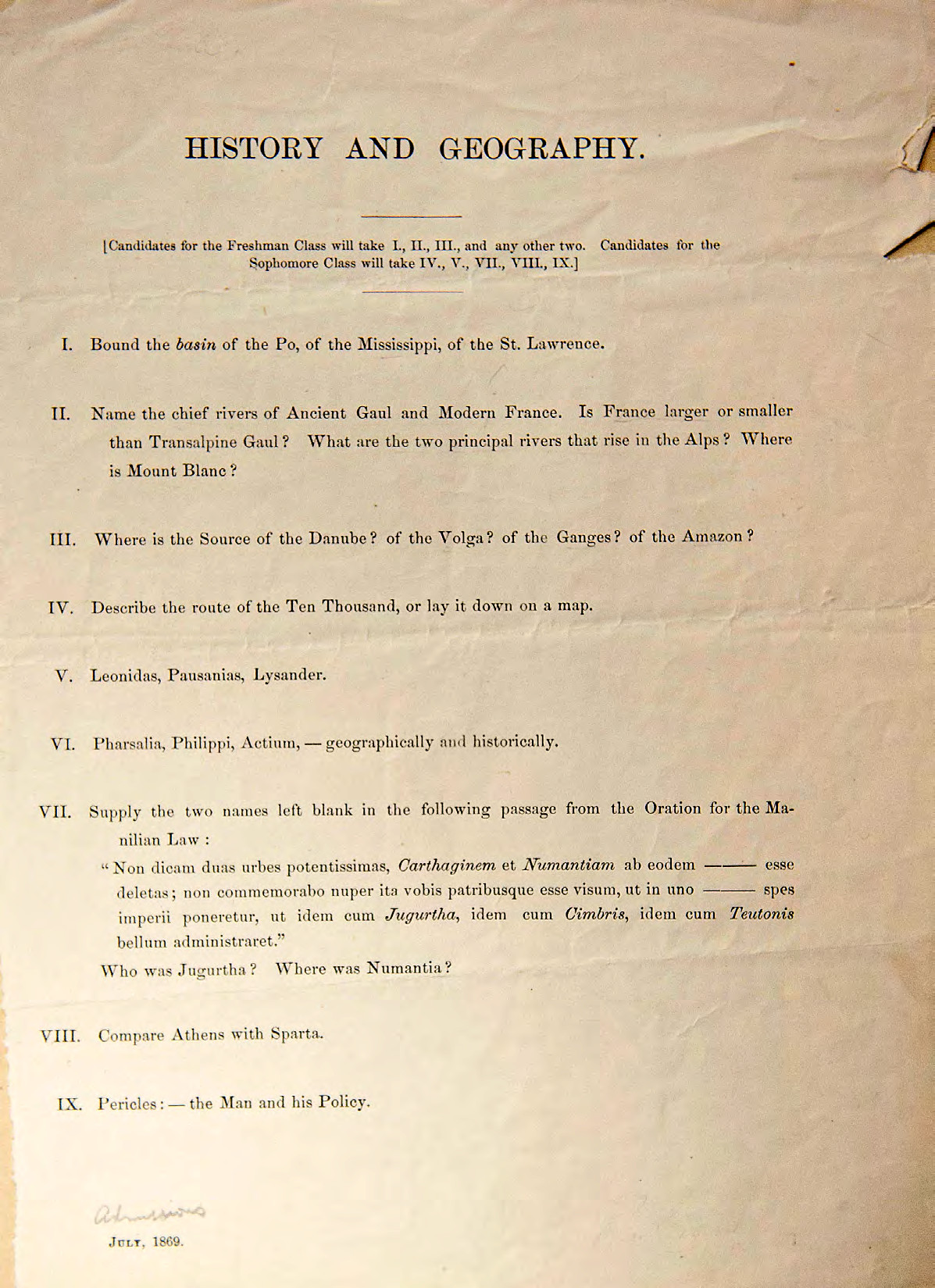
The history and geography section of the 1869 entrance examination to Harvard College.

Mean SAT scores of college-bound seniors
	All		Male		Female	
Class year	Reading /Verbal Score	Math Score	Reading /Verbal Score	Math Score	Reading /Verbal Score	Math Score
1972	530	509	531	527	529	489
1973	523	506	523	525	521	389
1974	521	505	524	524	520	488
1975	512	498	515	518	509	479
1976	509	497	511	520	508	475
1977	507	496	509	520	505	474
1978	507	494	511	517	503	474
1979	505	493	509	516	501	473
1980	502	492	506	515	498	473
1981	502	492	508	516	496	473
1982	504	493	509	516	499	473
1983	503	494	508	515	498	474
1984	504	497	511	518	598	478
1985	509	500	514	522	503	480
1986	509	500	515	523	504	479
1987	507	501	512	523	502	481
1988	505	501	512	521	499	483
1989	504	502	510	523	498	482
1990	500	501	505	521	496	483
1991	499	500	503	520	495	482
1992	500	501	504	521	496	484
1993	500	503	504	524	497	484
1994	499	504	501	523	497	487
1995	504	506	505	525	502	490
1996	505	508	507	527	503	492
1997	505	511	507	530	503	494
1998	505	512	509	531	502	496
1999	505	511	509	531	502	495
2000	505	514	507	533	504	498
2001	506	514	509	533	502	498
2002	504	516	507	534	502	500
2003	507	519	512	537	503	503
2004	508	518	512	537	504	501
2005	508	520	513	538	505	504
2006	503	518	505	536	502	502
2007	501	514	503	532	500	499
2008	500	514	502	532	499	499
2009	499	514	502	533	497	498
2010	500	515	502	533	498	499
2011	497	514	500	531	495	500
2012	496	514	498	532	493	499
2013	496	514	499	531	494	499
2014	497	513	499	530	495	499
2015	495	511	497	527	493	496
2016	494	508	496	524	493	494
2017	533	527	532	538	534	516
2018	536	531	534	542	539	522
2019	531	528	529	537	534	519
2020	528	523	523	531	532	516
2021	533	528	530	537	535	519
2022	529	521	526	530	531	512
2023	520	508	517	515	523	500
2024	519	505	516	514	522	496
2025	521	508	520	515	522	500
2026	528	517	528	527	528	508

In the late nineteenth century, elite colleges and universities had their own entrance exams and they required candidates to travel to the school to take the tests. The subjects that were tested, and what topics were required of the student applicant within each subject, could vary from one college to another. This panoply of requirements was seen as unreasonable both by leaders of private high school academies as well as an increasing number of public high school principals. To better organize matters, the College Board, a consortium of colleges in the northeastern United States, was formed in late 1899 to establish a nationally administered, uniform set of essay tests based on the curricula of the boarding schools that typically provided graduates to the colleges of the Ivy League and Seven Sisters, among others. The first College Board exam—covering mathematics, the physical sciences, history, languages, and other subjects—was administered in 1901 to fewer than 1,000 candidates.

In the same time period, Lewis Terman and others began to promote the use of tests such as Alfred Binet's in American schools. Terman in particular thought that such tests could identify an innate "intelligence quotient" (IQ) in a person. The results of an IQ test could then be used to find an elite group of students who would be given the chance to finish high school and go on to college. By the mid-1920s, the increasing use of IQ tests, such as the Army Alpha test administered to recruits in World War I, led the College Board to commission the development of the SAT. The commission, headed by Carl Brigham, argued that the test predicted success in higher education by identifying candidates primarily on the basis of intellectual promise rather than on specific accomplishment in high school subjects, with the specific aim to exclude Black students:

[Brigham] created the test to uphold a racial caste system. He advanced this theory of standardized testing as a means of upholding racial purity in his book A Study of American Intelligence. The tests, he wrote, would prove the racial superiority of white Americans and prevent "the continued propagation of defective strains in the present population"—chiefly, the "infiltration of white blood into the Negro".

By 1930, however, Brigham would repudiate his own conclusions, writing that "comparative studies of various national and racial groups may not be made with existing tests" and that SAT scores could not reflect some innate, genetically-based ability, but instead would be "a composite including schooling, family background, familiarity with English and everything else, relevant and irrelevant." In 1934, James Conant and Henry Chauncey used the SAT as a means to identify recipients for scholarships to Harvard University. Specifically, Conant wanted to find students, other than those from the traditional northeastern private schools, that could do well at Harvard. The success of the scholarship program and the advent of World War II led to the end of the College Board essay exams and to the SAT being used as the only admissions test for College Board member colleges.

The SAT rose in prominence after World War II due to several factors. Machine-based scoring of multiple-choice tests taken by pencil had made it possible to rapidly process the exams. At the time, elite colleges were admitting mainly students from elite private schools and wanted to take in students from other backgrounds. The G.I. Bill produced an influx of millions of veterans into higher education. The formation of the Educational Testing Service (ETS) also played a significant role in the expansion of the SAT beyond the roughly fifty colleges that made up the College Board at the time. The ETS was formed in 1947 by the College Board, Carnegie Foundation for the Advancement of Teaching, and the American Council on Education, to consolidate respectively the operations of the SAT, the GRE, and the achievement tests developed by Ben Wood for use with Conant's scholarship exams. The new organization was to be philosophically grounded in the concepts of open-minded, scientific research in testing with no doctrine to sell and with an eye toward public service. The ETS was chartered after the death of Brigham, who had opposed the creation of such an entity. Brigham felt that the interests of a consolidated testing agency would be more aligned with sales or marketing than with research into the science of testing. It has been argued that the interest of the ETS in expanding the SAT in order to support its operations aligned with the desire of public college and university faculties to have smaller, diversified, and more academic student bodies as a means to increase research activities. In 1951, about 80,000 SATs were taken; in 1961, about 800,000; and by 1971, about 1.5 million SATs were being taken each year. As more and more students from all over the U.S. tried to enter college, the SAT became more of a high-stakes exam; colleges needed something they could trust to fairly assess a prospective student's scholastic aptitude.

During the 2010s, there was concern over the continued decline of SAT scores, which might be due to the expansion of the test-taking population. (See graph below.)

In the wake of Operation Varsity Blues, it came to light that some wealthy parents obtained extra time on the SATs from doctors willing to sign off on false reports for the students. Already in the 2000s, concerns over parents obtaining fraudulent mental diagnoses to give their children an unfair advantage had been raised.

Historical average SAT scores of college-bound seniors.

== Timeline ==
A timeline of notable events in the history of the SAT follows.

=== 1901: College Board begins administering exams ===
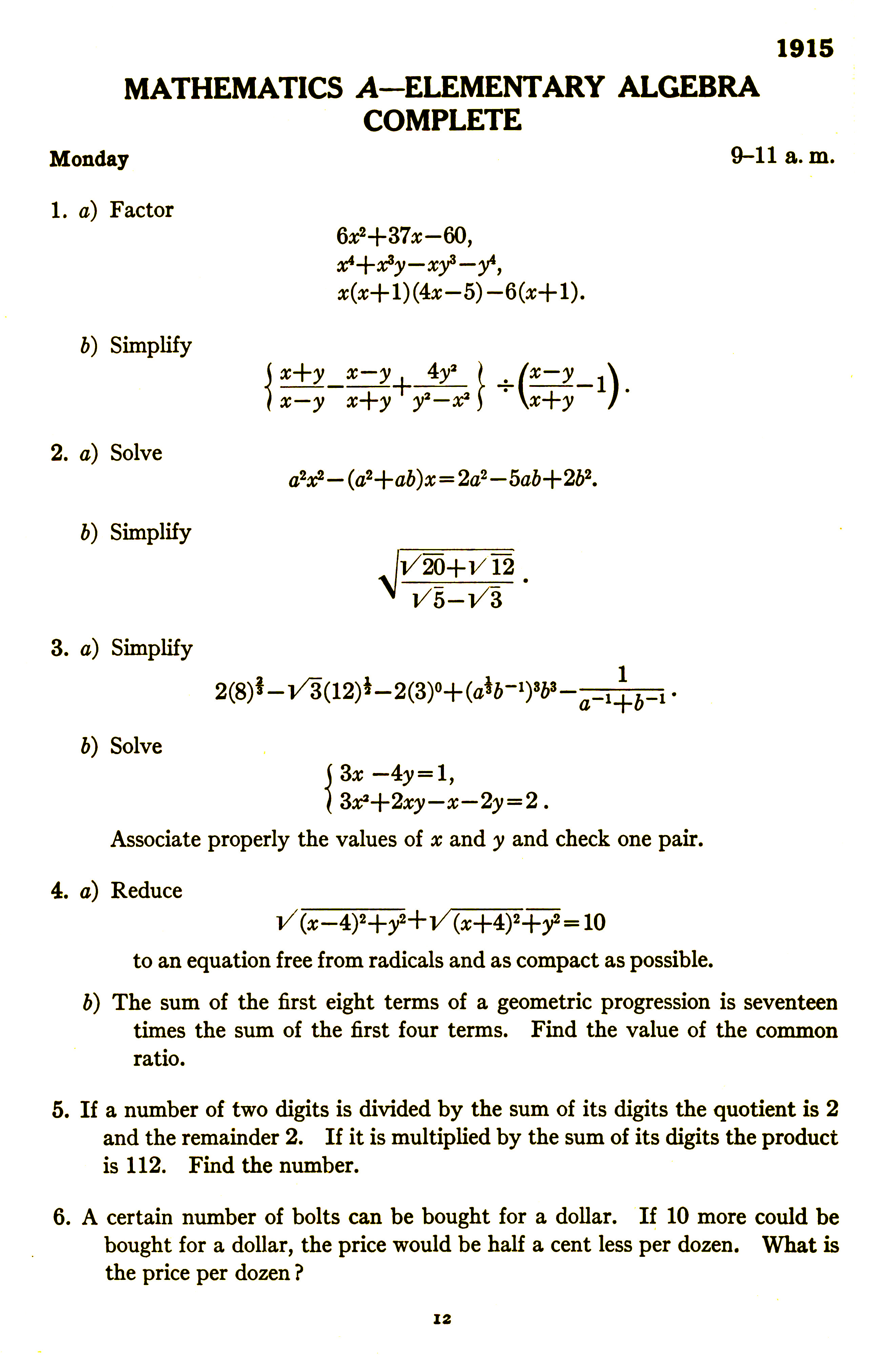
The Mathematics A exam of the 1915 College Board examinations.

On June 17, 1901, the first exams of the College Board were administered to 973 students across 67 locations in the United States, and two in Europe. Although those taking the test came from a variety of backgrounds, approximately one third were from New York, New Jersey, or Pennsylvania. The majority of those taking the test were from private schools, academies, or endowed schools. About 60% of those taking the test applied to Columbia University. The test contained sections on English, French, German, Latin, Greek, history, geography, political science, biology, mathematics, chemistry, and physics. The College Board exams, which required essay responses from students and took several days to administer, were graded on a scale with a maximum score of 100. Until 1910, the grades were accompanied by verbal designations: "Excellent" (90-100), "Good" (75-89), "Doubtful" (60-74), "Poor" (40-49) [sic] or "Very Poor" (below 40).

=== 1926: First SAT administration ===
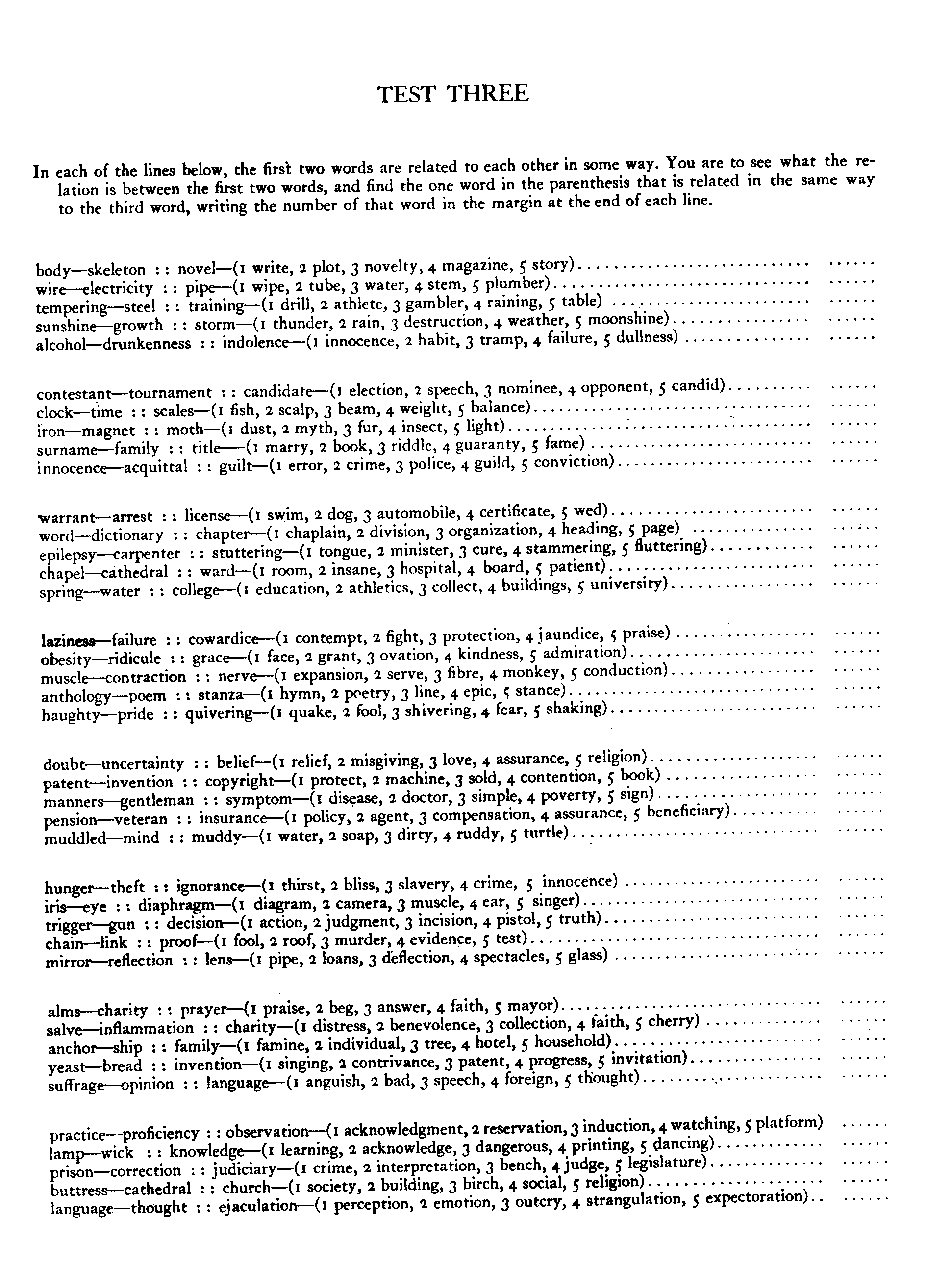
The analogies sub-test of the Princeton 1925 test

The first administration of the SAT occurred on June 23, 1926, when it was known as the Scholastic Aptitude Test. This test, prepared by a committee headed by Princeton psychologist Carl Campbell Brigham, had sections of definitions, arithmetic, classification, artificial language, antonyms, number series, analogies, logical inference, and paragraph reading. Several sections of the SAT were minor revisions of those appearing in a test that Brigham had given to incoming freshman to Princeton University in 1925. For example, sub-test three (analogies) of the Princeton test was used verbatim (except for the ordering of the questions) as the SAT analogies sub-test. The Princeton test was itself derived from material taken from intelligence tests administered to recruits to the United States Army during World War I. Like many intelligence tests of the time, the non-mathematical questions on the SAT put considerable weight on word definitions and usage. The SAT was administered to 8,040 students (60% of them men) at over 300 test centers. The majority of men were applying to Yale University, University of Pennsylvania, or Princeton University, and the majority of women were applying to Smith College, Wellesley College, or Vassar College. The test was paced rather quickly: test-takers were given 97 minutes to answer 315 questions. The raw score of each participating student was converted to a score scale with a mean of 500 and a standard deviation of 100. This scale was effectively equivalent to a 200 to 800 scale, although students could score more than 800 and less than 200.

=== 1928–1929: Math removal and more changes ===
In 1928, the number of sections on the SAT was reduced to seven, and the time limit was increased to slightly under two hours. In 1929, the number of sections was again reduced, this time to six. These changes were designed in part to give test-takers more time per question. For these two years, all of the sections tested verbal ability: math was eliminated from the SAT. The test developers, using test score data from 1926 and 1927 to calculate correlations between the various SAT sub-tests, felt that the mathematics sections were measuring a different component of intelligence than the verbal sections, and should be removed to be re-developed later as sub-tests with a score separate from that of the verbal sections.

=== 1930s: Continuous changes ===
In 1930 the SAT was first split into the verbal and math sections, a structure that would continue until 2005 when a new writing section would be added. The verbal section of the 1930 test covered a more narrow range of content than its predecessors, examining only antonyms (with six possible answer choices), double definitions (filling in two blanks with provided words to best complete a sentence), and paragraph reading. In 1936, analogies were re-added. Between 1936 and 1946, students had between 80 and 115 minutes to answer 250 verbal questions (over a third of which were on antonyms). The mathematics test introduced in 1930 contained 100 free response questions to be answered in 80 minutes and focused primarily on speed. From 1936 to 1941, like the 1928 and 1929 tests, the mathematics section was eliminated. When the mathematics portion of the test was re-added in 1942, it consisted of multiple-choice questions.

=== 1941 and 1942: Standardized score scales introduced ===
Until 1941, the scores on all SATs had been scaled to a mean of 500 with a standard deviation of 100. Although one test-taker could be compared to another for a given test date, comparisons from one year to another could not be made. For example, a score of 500 achieved on an SAT taken in one year could reflect a different ability level than a score of 500 achieved in another year. By 1940, it had become clear that setting the mean SAT score to 500 every year was unfair to those students who happened to take the SAT with a group of higher average ability.

In order to make cross-year score comparisons possible, in April 1941 the SAT verbal section was scaled to a mean of 500, and a standard deviation of 100, and the June 1941 SAT verbal section was equated (linked) to the April 1941 test. All SAT verbal sections after 1941 were equated to previous tests so that the same scores on different SATs would be comparable. Similarly, in June 1942 the SAT math section was equated to the April 1942 math section, which itself was linked to the 1942 SAT verbal section, and all SAT math sections after 1942 would be equated to previous tests. From this point forward, SAT mean scores could change over time, depending on the average ability of the group taking the test compared to the roughly 10,600 students taking the SAT in April 1941. The 1941 and 1942 score scales would remain in use until 1995.

=== 1946: Verbal section changes ===
Paragraph reading was eliminated from the verbal portion of the SAT in 1946, and replaced with reading comprehension, and "double definition" questions were replaced with sentence completions. Between 1946 and 1957, students were given 90 to 100 minutes to complete 107 to 170 verbal questions. Starting in 1958, time limits became more stable, and for 17 years, until 1975, students had 75 minutes to answer 90 questions. In 1959, questions on data sufficiency were introduced to the mathematics section and then replaced with quantitative comparisons in 1974. In 1974, both verbal and math sections were reduced from 75 minutes to 60 minutes each, with changes in test composition compensating for the decreased time.

=== 1953-54: Formula scoring is introduced and students are instructed on guessing ===
Starting in December 1953, the (pre-scaled) score on each section of the SAT was changed from rights-only (number correct) to a formula calculation: number of correct answers minus the number of incorrect answers divided by N, where N is one less than the number of answer choices for each question. Prior to 1954, a test taker was not instructed about whether or not to randomly guess on a multiple-choice SAT question. For example, the instructions for a 1943 version of the test stated that the test taker should "work steadily and as quickly as is consistent with accuracy" but did not make any reference to guessing. Starting in 1954, the instructions included: "In this test a percentage of the wrong answers will be subtracted from the number of right answers as a correction for haphazard guessing."

=== 1956: SAT scores are released to students ===
In the early days of the SAT, the individual results of the tests were made known only to the colleges or universities to which the test takers were applying. In October 1937, the College Board voted to begin sending SAT scores to the students' high schools as well, reasoning that the scores may help the secondary schools advise their students on which colleges were most suitable for them. In 1956, the College Board began making scores available to the test takers themselves.

=== 1960s and 1970s: Mean scores decline ===
From 1926 to 1941, scores on the SAT were scaled to make 500 the mean score on each section. In 1941 and 1942, SAT scores were standardized via test equating, and as a consequence, average verbal and math scores could vary from that time forward. In 1952, mean verbal and math scores were 476 and 494, respectively, and scores were generally stable in the 1950s and early 1960s. However, starting in the mid-1960s and continuing until the early 1980s, SAT scores declined: the average verbal score dropped by about 50 points, and the average math score fell by about 30 points. By the late 1970s, only the upper third of test takers were doing as well as the upper half of those taking the SAT in 1963. From 1961 to 1977, the number of SATs taken per year doubled, suggesting that the decline could be explained by demographic changes in the group of students taking the SAT. Commissioned by the College Board, an independent study of the decline found that most (up to about 75%) of the test decline in the 1960s could be explained by compositional changes in the group of students taking the test; however, only about 25 percent of the 1970s decrease in test scores could similarly be explained. Later analyses suggested that up to 40 percent of the 1970s decline in scores could be explained by demographic changes, leaving unknown at least some of the reasons for the decline.

=== 1993: SAT renamed ===
By the late 1980s, the College Board was considering changes to its testing program and had asked a group of educators and administrators from high schools and colleges to form a commission to review and advise the College Board proposals. In a 1990 report, the commission suggested that the initialism SAT, which up until this time stood for Scholastic Aptitude Test, should be changed to stand for Scholastic Assessment Test because the test could "no longer be accurately described as a test of aptitude". In 1993, the College Board changed the name of the test to SAT I: Reasoning Test and changed the name of the Achievement Tests to SAT II: Subject Tests. Together, all of these tests were to be collectively known as the Scholastic Assessment Tests. The president of the College Board at the time said that the name change was meant "to correct the impression among some people that the SAT measures something that is innate and impervious to change regardless of effort or instruction."

=== 1994: Major changes ===
In early 1994, substantial changes were made to the SAT. Antonyms were removed from the verbal section in order to make rote memorization of vocabulary less useful. Also, the fraction of verbal questions devoted to passage-based reading material was increased from about 30% to about 50%, and the passages were chosen to be more like typical college-level reading material, compared to previous SAT reading passages. The changes for increased emphasis on analytical reading were made in response to a 1990 report issued by a commission established by the College Board. The commission recommended that the SAT should, among other things, "approximate more closely the skills used in college and high school work". A mandatory essay had been considered as well for the new version of the SAT; however, criticism from minority groups, as well as a concomitant increase in the cost of the test necessary to grade the essay, led the College Board to drop it from the planned changes.

An example of an SAT student-produced response ("grid-in") math question (introduced in 1994) and the correctly gridded answer

Major changes were also made to the SAT mathematics section at this time, due in part to the influence of suggestions made by the National Council of Teachers of Mathematics. Test-takers were now permitted to use calculators on the math sections of the SAT. Also, for the first time since 1935, the SAT would now include some math questions that were not multiple choice, and would require students to supply the answers for those questions. According to the College Board, this new question format would be less susceptible to guessing using answer choices and other "back-door" approaches to solving multiple-choice questions. Additionally, some of these "student-produced response" questions could have more than one correct answer. The tested mathematics content on the SAT was expanded to include concepts of slope of a line, probability, elementary statistics including median and mode, and problems involving counting.

=== 1995: Recentering (to raise the mean score back to 500) ===
By the early 1990s, average combined SAT scores were around 900 (typically, 425 on the verbal and 475 on the math). The average scores on the 1994 modification of the SAT I were similar: 428 on the verbal and 482 on the math. SAT scores for admitted applicants to highly selective colleges in the United States were typically much higher. For example, the score ranges of the middle 50% of admitted applicants to Princeton University in 1985 were 600 to 720 (verbal) and 660 to 750 (math). Similarly, median scores on the modified 1994 SAT for freshmen entering Yale University in the fall of 1995 were 670 (verbal) and 720 (math). For the majority of SAT takers, however, verbal and math scores were below 500: In 1992, half of the college-bound seniors taking the SAT were scoring between 340 and 500 on the verbal section and between 380 and 560 on the math section, with corresponding median scores of 420 and 470, respectively.

The drop in SAT verbal scores, in particular, meant that the usefulness of the SAT score scale (200 to 800) had become degraded. At the top end of the verbal scale, significant gaps were occurring between raw scores and uncorrected scaled scores: a perfect raw score no longer corresponded to an 800, and a single omission out of 85 questions could lead to a drop of 30 or 40 points in the scaled score. Corrections to scores above 700 had been necessary to reduce the size of the gaps and to make a perfect raw score result in an 800. At the other end of the scale, about 1.5 percent of test-takers would have scored below 200 on the verbal section if that had not been the reported minimum score. Although the math score averages were closer to the center of the scale (500) than the verbal scores, the distribution of math scores was no longer well approximated by a normal distribution. These problems, among others, suggested that the original score scale and its reference group of about 10,000 students taking the SAT in 1941 needed to be replaced.

Beginning with the test administered in April 1995, the SAT score scale was recentered to return the average math and verbal scores close to 500. Although only 25 students had received perfect scores of 1600 in all of 1994, 137 students taking the April test scored 1600. The new scale used a reference group of about one million seniors in the class of 1990: the scale was designed so that the SAT scores of this cohort would have a mean of 500 and a standard deviation of 110. Because the new scale would not be directly comparable to the old scale, scores awarded in April 1995 and later were officially reported with an "R" (for example, "560R") to reflect the change in scale, a practice that was continued until 2001. Scores awarded before April 1995 may be compared to those on the recentered scale by using official College Board tables. For example, verbal and math scores of 500 received before 1995 correspond to scores of 580 and 520, respectively, on the 1995 scale.

=== 1995: Controversy over recentering ===
Certain educational organizations viewed the SAT recentering initiative as an attempt to stave off international embarrassment in regards to continuously declining test scores, even among top students. As evidence, it was presented that the number of pupils who scored above 600 on the verbal portion of the test had fallen from a peak of 112,530 in 1972 to 73,080 in 1993, a 36% backslide, despite the fact that the total number of test-takers had risen by over 500,000.

=== 1997: SAT renamed ===
After the 1994 changes to the SAT, major news organizations, as well as the president of the College Board, referred to the SAT using the name Scholastic Assessment Test. However, in the spring of 1997, the College Board announced that the SAT by itself could not properly be called the Scholastic Assessment Test, and that the letters SAT were the trademark and did not stand for anything. At the time, the historian of education Diane Ravitch remarked that "calling [the SAT] the Scholastic Assessment Test is like calling it the Scholastic Test Test". Minor name changes would be made later: In 2004, the Roman numeral in SAT I: Reasoning Test was dropped, making SAT Reasoning Test the name of the SAT, and in 2016 the "Reasoning Test" portion of the name was eliminated when the test was redesigned in 2016.

=== 2002: "Score Choice" discontinued for SAT II tests ===
Since 1993, using a policy referred to as "Score Choice", students taking the SAT-II subject exams were able to choose whether or not to report the resulting scores to a college to which the student was applying. In October 2002, the College Board dropped the Score Choice option for SAT-II exams, matching the score policy for the traditional SAT tests that required students to release all scores to colleges. The College Board said that, under the old score policy, many students who waited to release scores would forget to do so and miss admissions deadlines. It was also suggested that the old policy of allowing students the option of which scores to report favored students who could afford to retake the tests.

=== 2005: Introduction of an 800-point essay section (leading to a 2400-point score) ===
In 2005, the test was changed again, largely in response to criticism by the University of California system. In order to have the SAT more closely reflect high school curricula, certain types of questions were eliminated, including analogies from the verbal section and quantitative comparison items from the math section. A new writing section, with an essay, based on the former SAT II Writing Subject Test, was added, in part to increase the chances of closing the opening gap between the highest and midrange scores. The writing section reported a multiple-choice subscore that ranged from 20 to 80 points. Other factors included the desire to test the writing ability of each student; hence the essay. The writing section added an additional maximum 800 points to the score, which increased the new maximum score to 2400. The "New SAT" was first offered on March 12, 2005, after the last administration of the "old" SAT in January 2005. The mathematics section was expanded to cover three years of high school mathematics. To emphasize the importance of reading, the verbal section's name was changed to the Critical Reading section.

=== 2005: Scoring problems of October SATs and subsequent lawsuit ===
In March 2006, it was announced that a small percentage of the SATs taken in October 2005 had been scored incorrectly due to the test papers being moist and not scanning properly and that some students had received erroneous scores. The College Board announced they would change the scores for the students who were given a lower score than they earned, but at this point many of those students had already applied to colleges using their original scores. The College Board decided not to change the scores for the students who were given a higher score than they earned. A lawsuit was filed in 2006 on behalf of the 4,411 students who received an incorrect score on the SAT. The class-action suit was settled in August 2007, when the College Board and Pearson Educational Measurement, the company that scored the SATs, announced they would pay $2.85 million into a settlement fund. Under the agreement, students could either elect to receive $275 or submit a claim for more money if the damage was greater.

=== 2006: Maine becomes the first state to mandate taking the SAT ===
In April of 2006, Maine required all high-school juniors in the state to take the SAT as part of a special school day on a Saturday. The SAT was to be used in place of the normal statewide exam used to assess whether students met state standards for graduation. The cost of the SAT was paid for by Maine and offered free to students taking the exam. Within 10 years, the College Board will be offering the SAT on a weekday during the school year (called an "SAT School Day" administration) in participating states, and by 2024 more than two-thirds of the senior class graduating in that year will take the SAT during a school day.

=== 2009: "Score Choice" made available for the SAT ===
As part of an effort to "reduce student stress and improve the test-day experience", in late 2008 the College Board announced that the Score Choice option, recently dropped for SAT subject exams, would be available for both the SAT subject tests and the SAT starting in March 2009. At the time, some college admissions officials agreed that the new policy would help to alleviate student test anxiety, while others questioned whether the change was primarily an attempt to make the SAT more competitive with the ACT, which had long had a comparable score choice policy. Recognizing that some colleges would want to see the scores from all tests taken by a student, under this new policy, the College Board would encourage but not force students to follow the requirements of each college to which scores would be sent. A number of highly selective colleges and universities, including Yale, the University of Pennsylvania, Cornell, and Stanford, rejected the Score Choice option at the time, but some of them would later participate in the score choice program.

=== 2012: Increased security introduced at test centers ===
Beginning in the fall of 2012, test takers were required to submit a current, recognizable photo during registration. In order to be admitted to their designated test center, students were required to present their photo admission ticket—or another acceptable form of photo ID—for comparison to the one submitted by the student at the time of registration. The changes were made in response to a series of cheating incidents, primarily at high schools in Long Island, New York, in which high-scoring test takers were using fake photo IDs to take the SAT for other students. In addition to the registration photo stipulation, test takers were required to identify their high school, to which their scores, as well as the submitted photos, would be sent. In the event of an investigation involving the validity of a student's test scores, their photo may be made available to institutions to which they have sent scores. Any college that is granted access to a student's photo is first required to certify that the student has been admitted to the college requesting the photo.

=== 2016: Redesign of the SAT (notably including a return to a 1600 point scale) ===
On March 5, 2014, the College Board announced its plan to redesign the SAT in order to link the exam more closely to the work high school students encounter in the classroom. The new exam was administered for the first time in March 2016. Some of the major changes were: an emphasis on the use of evidence to support answers, a shift away from obscure vocabulary to words that students are more likely to encounter in college and career, an optional essay, questions having four rather than five answer options, and the removal of penalty for wrong answers (rights-only scoring). The Critical Reading section was replaced with the new Evidence-Based Reading and Writing section (the Reading Test and the Writing and Language Test). The scope of mathematics content was narrowed to include fewer topics, including linear equations, quadratics, and basic trigonometry. The essay score was separated from the final score, and institutions could choose whether or not to consider it. As a result of these changes, the highest score was returned to 1600. These modifications were the first major redesign to the structure of the test since 2005. As the test no longer deducts points for wrong answers, the numerical scores and the percentiles appeared to have increased after the new SAT was unveiled in 2016. However, this does not necessarily mean students came better prepared.

To combat the perceived advantage of costly test preparation courses, the College Board announced a new partnership with Khan Academy to offer free online practice problems and instructional videos.

=== 2019: Introduction and abandonment of the "Adversity Score" and launch of "Landscape" ===
In May 2019, the College Board announced that it would calculate each SAT taker's "Adversity Score" using factors such as the proportion of students in a school district receiving free or subsidized lunch or the level of crime in that neighborhood. The higher the score, the more adversity the student faced. However, this triggered a backlash from the general public as people were skeptical of how complex information could be conveyed with a single number and were concerned that it might be politically weaponized. The College Board abandoned the Adversity Score in August 2019 and created a new tool called "Landscape" to provide the same sort of details to admissions officers using government information but without calculating a score.

=== 2020–2021: Discontinuation of SAT essay and SAT II tests and the impact of COVID-19 ===
In the wake of the COVID-19 pandemic, which made administering and taking the tests difficult, on January 19, 2021, the College Board announced plans to discontinue the optional SAT essay following the June 2021 administration. Although the SAT essay was discontinued by the start of the 2021–22 school year for national administrations, the essay continues to be administered in some states as a part of their state-wide SAT school-day testing programs.

While some administrations of the SAT were canceled during the pandemic, others continued with precautionary measures such as requirements of temperature checks, enhanced ventilation, higher ceilings, physical distancing, and face masks. The College Board also announced the immediate discontinuation of the SAT Subject Tests in the United States, and the same internationally after the June 2021 administration.

=== 2024: Change to a digital format ===
In January 2022, College Board revealed its plan to administer the SAT digitally to American students in 2024 and to students in other countries in 2023. The digital format of the test would simplify logistics and allow scores to be determined in a matter of days rather than weeks. Score reports would also carry information about two-year collegiate programs and vocational training. Students may bring their own laptop or tablet computers but must sit at a designated location; those without a device will be provided with one.

The College Board also announced that the SAT would be shortened to roughly two hours from three, with an onscreen calculator provided for the math section.

On March 9, 2024, the digital version of the SAT was administered nationwide in the United States. The test consists of two sections: Reading and Writing, and Math, with two 32-minute modules for reading and writing (64 minutes total) and two 35-minute modules for math (70 minutes total), making the length of the SAT 2 hours and 14 minutes. In each section, the questions posed in the second module depend on the performance of the student on the questions in the first module. Both math modules allow the use of a calculator: either an onscreen Desmos-based graphing calculator, or a physical one that the student brings.
