= Kobe Tai =

American pornographic film actress

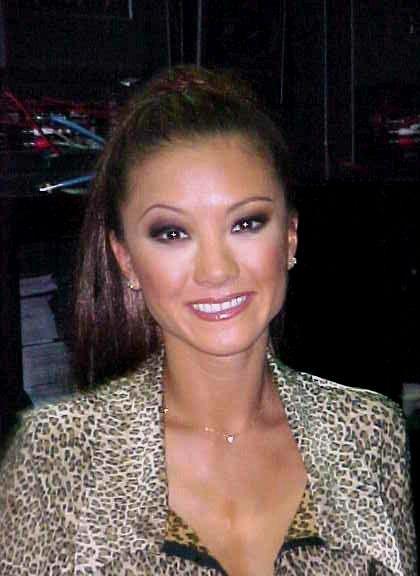
- Tai in Las Vegas, January 2000
- Occupation: Pornographic film actress
- Spouse: Mark Davis (m. 1997; div. 1999)

Kobe Tai is an American pornographic film actress.

== Pornographic film career ==
Tai was a contract performer with Vivid Entertainment. In 2011, Complex ranked her first on its list of "The Top 50 Hottest Asian Porn Stars of All Time".

== Mainstream appearances ==
In addition to her roles in porn films, Tai (billed as "Carla Scott") appeared in the mainstream movie Very Bad Things, portraying a stripper at a bachelor party, and sang background vocals for Marilyn Manson's song, "New Model No. 15", on the album Mechanical Animals.

She was an Opening Night Guest of Honor along with Asia Carrera at the Big Apple Anime Fest's Midnight Anime Concourse.

== Awards and nominations ==
Year	Ceremony	Result	Award	Work
1997	Hot d'Or Award	Won	Best American Starlet	—N/a
2000	AVN Award	Nominated	Best Supporting Actress – Film	The Awakening
2000	AVN Award	Nominated	Best Group Sex Scene, Film (with Cheyne Collins, Evan Stone, & Andrew Youngman)	The Awakening
2000	XRCO Award	Nominated	Actress (Single Performance)	The Awakening
2003	NightMoves Award	Won	Best Feature Production (Fan's Choice) (with Jenna Jameson)	Jenna Loves Kobe
