= Big Apple Anime Fest =

2001–2003 anime convention

- Status: Defunct
- Venue: Marriott New York Marquis
- Locations: New York City, New York
- Country: United States
- Inaugurated: 2001
- Most recent: 2003
- Attendance: 12,832 in 2003
- Organizer: Central Park Media

The Big Apple Anime Fest (BAAF) was an anime convention sponsored by Mitsubishi Motors which was held annually between 2001 and 2003 and supported by a consortium of anime and manga companies.

In 2001, John O'Donnell conceived and founded the Big Apple Anime Fest (BAAF), an annual anime convention and film festival held in New York City. O'Donnell established BAAF as a separate for-profit company, independent from Central Park Media's operations, describing his ambition for the event as creating the "Cannes Film Festival of anime and manga culture."

== History ==
=== Event history ===
Dates	Location	Atten.	Guests
October 26–28, 2001	Directors Guild of America Theater; New York, New York	3,500	Tim Eldred, Tiffany Grant, Matt K. Miller, Yuji Moriyama, Toshio Maeda, Kobe Tai, Asia Carrera and Koichi Ohata.
August 30 – September 2, 2002	Times Square; New York, New York	7,500	Mandy Bonhomme, Akitaroh Daichi, Yoko Kanno, Toshihiro Kawamoto, Yoshihiro Komada, Rachael Lillis, Taro Maki, Liam O'Brien, Tommy Ohtsuka, Ed Paul, Eric Stuart, Yoshiyuki Tomino, Shinichiro Watanabe, and Jimmy Zoppi.
August 29–31, 2003	Marriott New York Marquis; New York, New York	12,832	Michael Alston Baley, Marc Diraison, Keith Giffen, Tsukasa Hojo, Amy Howard-Wilson, Yasuhiro Irie, Takeshi Koike, Satoshi Kon, Hyun se Lee, Masao Maruyama, Taka Nagasawa, Takashi Nakamura, Liam O'Brien, Lisa Ortiz, Eric Stuart, Tomoko Taniguchi, Veronica Taylor, Ren Usami, and Tatsumi Yoda.

=== Founding and inaugural event (2001) ===
The inaugural BAAF took place October 26–28, 2001, over Halloween weekend, at multiple midtown Manhattan venues: the Directors Guild of America Theater hosted film screenings, the Park Central Hotel accommodated panels and events, and J&R Music World near City Hall hosted autograph sessions. The festival was organized as a consortium of industry sponsors and participants, with O'Donnell personally soliciting major corporate backers including Mitsubishi Motors, Panasonic, and Sony.

The keynote attraction of the inaugural event was the North American premiere of director Rintarō's Metropolis, made possible through Sony's primary sponsorship, with both Rintarō and screenwriter Katsuhiro Ōtomo originally scheduled to attend. The event also featured 35mm screenings of X: The Movie, Blood: The Last Vampire, and Spriggan, as well as panels, workshops, cosplay contests, and an overnight programming block. Guest appearances at the 2001 event included directors Kunihiko Ikuhara, Koichi Ohata, and Yuji Moriyama, and voice actors Crispin Freeman, Rachael Lillis, Lisa Ortiz, and Eric Stuart.

The timing of the event—held just six weeks after the September 11, 2001, attacks—created significant logistical challenges. The proximity of J&R Music World to the World Trade Center site affected autograph session attendance, Ōtomo withdrew citing safety concerns, and the Metropolis premiere required a content advisory due to its climax sequence depicting a collapsing skyscraper. Despite these difficulties, the event drew an estimated 3,500 attendees and was framed publicly as a celebration of cross-cultural bonds through anime.

=== Subsequent years and closure (2002–2003) ===
BAAF ran for two further editions: August 30–September 2, 2002, and August 29–31, 2003, both over Labor Day weekend. The 2003 event reported turnstile attendance of 12,832, though this figure reflected a "person-days" methodology—counting multi-day attendees once per day attended—rather than the unique-membership count used by most contemporary conventions. The 2003 event featured guests including directors Satoshi Kon and Takashi Nakamura, manga artists Tsukasa Hojo and Tomoko Taniguchi, and voice actors Veronica Taylor and Liam O'Brien.

Despite confirmed plans for a 2004 edition, BAAF announced it would skip that year due to the Republican National Convention occupying New York City over Labor Day weekend. O'Donnell subsequently confirmed there were no plans for a 2005 event, and the convention did not return. In his retrospective account of BAAF, Justin Sevakis—a former CPM employee who worked on the festival—noted that New York City's operational costs made sustaining a convention economically unviable given the scale of the anime industry at the time, and that O'Donnell had decided by the end of the 2003 event that it would be the festival's final year.

== Attendance counting ==
Big Apple Anime Fest's metric for counting attendance differed from those typically used by other anime conventions, counting person-days ("turnstile attendance") rather than memberships sold.

== See also ==
- Anime NYC
- New York Comic Con
- List of anime conventions
