= Egyptian and Rosicrucian Museum =

Museum in Curitiba, Paraná, Brazil

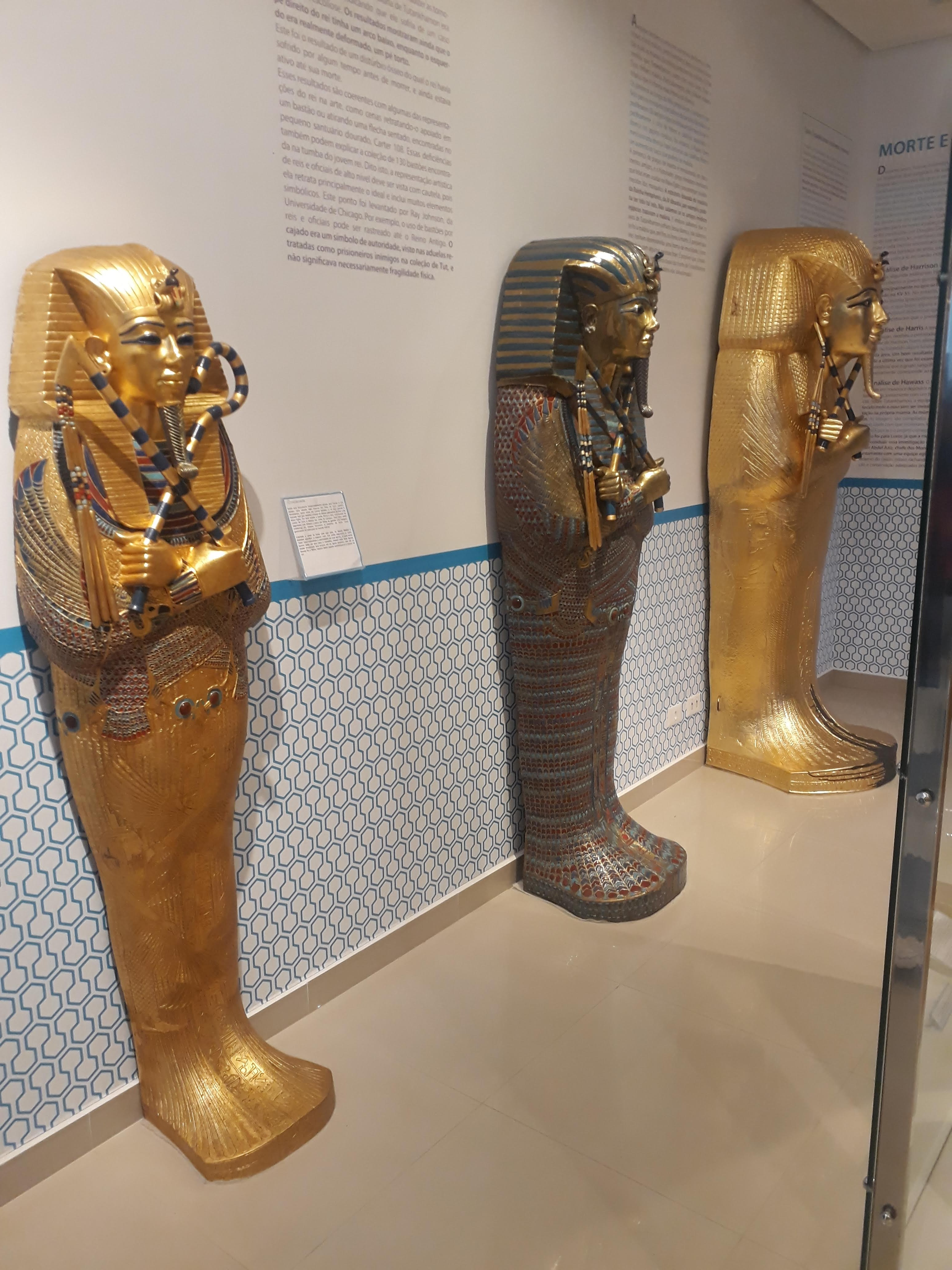
- Established: 17 October 1990
- Coordinates: 25.3904°S 49.2255°W
- Website: museuegipcioerosacruz.org.br

The Egyptian and Rosicrucian Museum is an Egyptian archaeology museum in Curitiba, Brazil. It has a collection composed mainly of replicas of Egyptian pieces belonging to several different periods. Its collection also includes Tothmea, the only Egyptian mummy in Brazil, donated to the museum in 1995 by the Rosicrucian Egyptian Museum in San Jose, California.

The museum opened on October 17, 1990.

== Temporary exhibits ==
In 2013, Cícero Moraes created 12 panels on facial reconstruction related to human evolution, which were presented in the exhibition "Faces of Evolution". All images displayed on that exhibition were donated to the Wikimedia Commons and came to illustrate posts of important publications online linked to science.
