= Scott Sonnon =

American martial artist

- Born: October 11, 1969 (age 56); Hershey, Pennsylvania, USA
- Occupation: martial artist

Scott Sonnon is a martial art expert, fitness coach, dyslexia advocate and wellness speaker. He has worked with movie stars such as Peta Wilson and fashion designer Donna Karan as well as Ultimate Fighting Championship mixed martial arts fighters such as Alberto Crane, Jorge Rivera, Andrei Arlovski, and Elvis Sinosic. He currently leads Human Performance for the United States Department of Energy and United States military special operations research in breathing techniques to improve performance and selection rates.

== Personal life ==
Sonnon was born in 1969, in Pennsylvania, USA. His family emigrated to the United States two generations before him from the town of Sonnon, district of Passau, Bavaria, Germany. As a child he was legally blind due to myopia and Thygeson's disease, suffered from Osteochondrosis and obesity, and was diagnosed with dyslexia. Sonnon is a member of Mensa International and has been a keynote speaker for the High IQ organization.

== Career ==
Sonnon is credited as having reintroduced Indian clubs in the form of clubbells to strength training. By 2007 he had been inducted into three halls of fame: the National Fitness Hall of Fame, the International Martial Arts Hall of Fame and the Personal Trainer Hall of Fame, and is known to the Sambo and Russian martial arts communities. As Sonnon is highly regarded in Sambo training, people have traveled great distances to attend his workshops.

Sonnon was voted one of "The 6 Most Influential Martial Artists of the 21st Century" by Black Belt Magazine in 2010 and in 2011 he was named one of "Top 25 Fitness Trainers in the World" by "Men's Fitness Magazine".

Sonnon is a global staff trainer for the 2014 Nike Academy. His fitness system, Circular Strength Training, has been adopted by members of the United States military and law enforcement community. He is also a published author, a public speaker, and an advocate for education about childhood obesity.

As a result of his struggles with illnesses and dyslexia as a child, he became a TED Fellow speaking on the nature of multiple learning styles being misdiagnosed as learning disabilities, and he advocates for dyslexia educational support in public schools.

=== Career highlights ===
From 1993 to 1995, National Sambo Coach of the United States Sambo Association
| 1995 USA Grand National Sambo champion | 1996 First US instructor licensed in Russian martial art ROSS Systema, appointed North American director of Russian Martial Art Federation |
| 1999–2001 Inducted into the International Martial Arts Hall of Fame | 1999 Awarded Master of Sports in Sambo by American Amateur Sambo Federation |
| 1999 Received license as an International Category Sambo referee | 1999 Elected vice-president of the American Sambo Federation |
| 1999 Appointed Combat Sambo chairman to the International Combat Sambo Commission for FIAS (International Amateur Sambo Federation) | 2001 Awarded the Leadership Award by International Martial Arts Hall of Fame |
| 2005 International Sanshou champion | 2007 Personal Trainer Hall of Fame Inductee |
| 2007 Accepted position as the conditioning advisor for the International Youth Conditioning Association. | 2009 Appointed Russian Sambo advisor to USADOJO Board of Advisors |
| 2009 Appointed Physical Training and Conditioning advisor to USADOJO Board of Advisors | 2009 Qualified to compete and accepted invitation to coach the US Martial Arts Team for the 2010 World Martial Arts Games |
2010 Trainer for the 160th Special Operations Aviation Regiment
2010 World Martial Arts Games Champion: Submission Grappling Gold Medalist, Sport Jiujitsu Gold Medalist, Mixed Martial Arts Gold Medalist
2010 Instructor for the Federal Law Enforcement Training Center
2010 Awarded Special Recognition Award from the Bellingham Fire Department at the 2010 Annual Awards Banquet

== Bibliography ==
- RMAX Magazine (2003–2008) ISSN 1555-7723
- Mastering Sambo for Mixed Martial Arts (2008) ISBN 978-1-58160-686-7
- Free to Move: The Intu-Flow Longevity System (2008) ISBN 978-0-9794275-6-5
- Prasara Yoga: Flow Beyond Thought (2007) ISBN 978-0-9794275-4-1
- The Big Book of Clubbell Training (2006) ISBN 978-0-9763560-6-6
- Clubbell Training for Circular Strength: An Ancient Tool for the Modern Athlete (2003) ISBN 978-0-9717949-2-4
- Body-Flow: Freedom from Fear-Reactivity (2003) ISBN 978-0-9717949-3-1
