= Margot Seitelman =

American Mensa first manager (1928–1989)

- Born: 23 February 1928; Würzburg, Germany
- Died: 5 November 1989 (aged 61); New York City
- Occupations: housewife, executive director of American Mensa

Margot Seitelman (23 February 1928 – 5 November 1989) was the first executive director of American Mensa, from 1961 shortly after its formation until her death in 1989. The offices of the organization were originally in her apartment.

== Biography ==
=== Early life ===
Seitelman was born in Würzburg, Germany to a Jewish family and immigrated to America via Luxembourg, where she settled in Brooklyn, New York.

=== Career ===
The American branch of Mensa International formed starting in 1959. Two years later, it was incorporated. It began to outgrow its all-volunteer status, and needed a paid employee to manage its affairs. The original Mensa organization in Britain had set a precedent of having a housewife manage the organization out of her home. Thus, when Seitelman answered the Mensa advertisement in The New York Times, she appeared to be an excellent match. She ran Mensa out of her Brooklyn apartment.

Her title was variously given as Director, Executive Secretary, and Executive Director.

Until it separated from U.S. Mensa in 1967, Margot also administered Canadian Mensa memberships.

Later, when the organization outgrew her ability to manage it part-time out of her home, her duties expanded to full-time stewardship, and an office suite was rented, though still in the same building in which she lived.

In her 28 years as an employee, she became affectionately known as the mother of American Mensa.

=== Marriage and children ===
Seitelman married and had three sons. Her marriage lasted 40 years.

=== Legacy ===
Seitelman died of cancer on 5 November 1989, at age 61, in Manhattan. At the time, she still held the executive director position for American Mensa. After her death, the organization moved its headquarters to Arlington, Texas, and expanded its staff.

== Awards ==
Though she led American Mensa for 28 years, she never became a member. After her death, she was awarded an honorary membership.
