= Carl Brigham =

American psychologist (1890–1943)

Carl Campbell Brigham
- Carl C. Brigham as an undergraduate student at Princeton around 1914
- Born: May 4, 1890; Marlborough, Massachusetts, U.S.
- Died: January 24, 1943 (aged 52); Princeton, New Jersey, U.S.
- Education: Princeton University
- Known for: Created the SAT for The College Board
- Spouse: Elizabeth G F Duffield

Carl Campbell Brigham (May 4, 1890 – January 24, 1943) was an American eugenicist and professor of psychology at Princeton University's Department of Psychology and a pioneer in the field of psychometrics. He sat on the advisory council of the American Eugenics Society (later known as the Society for Biodemography and Social Biology) and his early writings heavily influenced the eugenics movement and anti-immigration legislation in the United States. He created the SAT for The College Board.

== Early life, family and education ==
Carl Campbell Brigham was born May 4, 1890, in Marlborough, Massachusetts, to Charles Francis Brigham and Ida B. (Campbell) Brigham, the third of four children. His family has roots in early Massachusetts Bay Colony with ancestors that included Thomas Brigham (1603–1653) and Edmund Rice (1594–1663). Brigham's family became wealthy as a result of his grandfather's success in the California Gold Rush. Although many in his family attended Harvard, Brigham earned all of his degrees (B.A., M.A., and Ph.D.) at Princeton University. He married Elizabeth G F Duffield on February 10, 1923, and they had a daughter, Elizabeth H. Brigham (b. 1926).

== Career ==
At the outbreak of World War I, Brigham joined the military and was commissioned as first lieutenant in the Sanitary Corps, psychological service from October to December 1917 at Camp Dix. He was then assigned to the Surgeon General's office in Washington, D.C., where he worked with Robert Yerkes to administer the army mental tests to US Army recruits. From January to March 1918 he was at Camps Meade, Lee, and Gordon to conduct psychological experiments. In April 1918, he was assigned to the Tank Corps, but he never served overseas.

After the war was over, Brigham joined Princeton as a faculty member in 1920 and began working on adapting the army mental tests for use in college admissions. This test became highly controversial as a methodology for testing mental ability due to its biases favoring Caucasian [white] native-born Americans.

In 1923, Brigham published his influential book, A Study of American Intelligence. Analyzing the data from the World War I army mental tests, Brigham concluded that native-born (Caucasian) Americans had the highest intelligence out of the groups tested. He proclaimed the intellectual superiority of the "Nordic Race" and the inferiority of the "Alpine" (Eastern European), "Mediterranean", and "Negro" races and argued that immigration should be carefully controlled to safeguard the "American Intelligence". Brigham believed that in the early years of the twentieth century, American intelligence was declining because of recent immigration waves from Eastern Europe ("Carl Campbell Brigham: The Man who devised the SAT"). Harvard Professor E.G. Boring suggested that Brigham was not collecting data with scientific purpose which biased his results in favor of his ideas (1923).

The test administered to recruits during World War I was controversial and the inter-group differences were not easily explained. While Brigham conceded that some of the differences in measured intelligence could be attributed to differences in the level and quality of schooling received, he suggested that most of the differences were genetic in nature (Wedell, 1943).

By 1925, Brigham had devised his own college admissions test, known as the Princeton Test.

In 1926, Brigham created the SAT for College Board. College Board reviewed his book, A Study of American Intelligence, and wanted a test that could be administered to a wider group of schools that was developed by Brigham. The SAT test that Brigham developed contains writing, reading, and mathematics in a broader sense than the Army Test previously administered.

In his 1930 paper "Intelligence Tests of Immigrant Groups", Brigham recanted his 1923 analysis of the results of the Army Mental Tests. Native language was a variable greatly argued as to why the results favored native born Americans. Many people suggested that English speaking individuals had the advantage due to the way the test was written. There was no evidence in Brigham's study suggesting that intelligence, as reflected in the test scores, was related to social success or achievements. Due to having used prejudicial test administration and analytical techniques in his original research (he had not taken into consideration that the first language of some of the people he studied was not English), he acknowledged that his conclusions were "without foundation" and stated "that study with its entire hypothetical superstructure of racial differences collapses completely." He realized that the SAT test scores do not measure innate ability passed through genes, but are instead a "composite including schooling, family background, familiarity with English, and everything else relevant and irrelevant" (Fussell, 2019). Nevertheless, it had already been instrumental in fueling anti-immigrant sentiment in America and in the eugenics debate.

Brigham died January 24, 1943, in Princeton, New Jersey.

== Sources ==
- Encyclopedia of New Jersey
