= Roland Berrill =

Australian barrister

- Born: Roland Fabian Berrill; 6 October 1896; Mosman, Sydney, New South Wales, Australia
- Died: 26 September 1962; Eastbourne, Sussex, England
- Parents: Arthur E Berrill 1865–1918; Clare Mary MacDermott 1869–1933

Roland Fabian Berrill (6 October 1896 – 26 September 1962) was a British-Australian barrister who was the co-founder (with the English scientist and barrister Dr. Lancelot Ware OBE) of Mensa, the international society for intellectually gifted people.

== The founding of Mensa ==
Mensa was founded by Berrill and Lancelot Ware at Lincoln College, Oxford, England, on 1 October 1946. They originally called it the "High IQ Club". Lance Ware had the initial idea for the society, but Berrill founded Mensa in the usual sense: he supplied the start-up cash, wrote some initial idiosyncratic pamphlets and became Mensa's first Secretary.

Berrill was an unashamed elitist, who regretted the passing of an aristocratic tradition. He regarded Mensa as "an aristocracy of the intellect". He noticed with some disappointment that a majority of Mensans appeared to have come from humble homes.

At an early Mensa organizational meeting, one of the people present proposed that black people be excluded from Mensa. This was met by shocked silence. Then Berrill proposed that the motion be amended to exclude "green people with yellow stripes" instead. This amended motion passed, with one vote against. If the minutes of that meeting had not been lost, that statute might still be on the books of Mensa.

Berrill recruited around 400 people by self-administered IQ tests before his death.

== Personal life ==
Berrill was born in Australia in 1896 to English parents Arthur Edward Berrill and Clara Mary Macdermott. His father moved to Sydney in the 1870s and became an importer/exporter who was a frequent distributor of British books and periodicals abroad. The family returned to London in 1901. He was educated at the Roman Catholic Beaumont College, Windsor. Roland served in the Royal Artillery in the First World War; His elder brother, Lieut. Bernard Francis Berrill, was killed in 1915 in Flanders.

Although he was called to the bar, he never practised as a barrister but lived on the dividends of his investments.

He spent most of the rest of his life in England. He had brief trips to Tangier in 1936, New York City in 1937 and Durban, South Africa in 1959. On 22 November 1948 he spoke at the Socratic Club at Oxford, combining with Father Victor White, on the topic "Beyond Myth and Dogma" at Lady Margaret Hall in the University of Oxford.

Berrill was thick-set and sturdy, with a full dark beard and moustache. He believed in palmistry, phrenology, astrology, and Dianetics. These views were not popular within Mensa, and he was regarded by Mensans as "deficient in normal scepticism".

Berrill was a member of the Men's Dress Reform Party; he desired more colour in men's clothes, and objected to the uniformity common in those days. He never married.
