= Lancelot Ware =

English lawyer and biochemist (1915–2000)

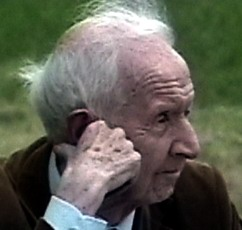
Dr. Lancelot Ware in May 1999

Lancelot Lionel Ware OBE (5 June 1915 – 15 August 2000) was an English barrister and biochemist. He co-founded Mensa, the international society for intellectually gifted people, with the Australian barrister Roland Berrill in 1946. It was originally called the "High IQ Club".

== Life ==
Ware was born in Mitcham, Surrey, the eldest child of Frederick Ware and Eleanor Emslie. He was educated at Steyning Grammar School and Sutton Grammar School before becoming a Royal Scholar at Imperial College London, where he studied mathematics. He subsequently obtained a PhD in biochemistry from Imperial College London.

In 1945, Ware went to Lincoln College, Oxford, to study law, obtaining an MA. While at Oxford, he co-founded Mensa with Roland Berrill in 1946.

In June 1980, at the age of 65, Ware married Joan Francesca Rae Quint (née Gomez), who survived him. He died on 15 August 2000, aged 85.

== Career ==
Ware undertook medical research with Henry Dale at the National Institute for Medical Research in Hampstead, London, and became a non-clinical medical researcher and lecturer in biochemistry at St Thomas' Hospital in London.

During World War II, Ware worked at the Porton Down secret research establishment. He then worked as a scientist for the Boots Company in Nottingham. During this time, he learned about IQ tests. At the end of the war in 1945, he started a law degree at Lincoln College, Oxford. In 1949, Ware was called to the Bar by Lincoln's Inn and he practised in the Chancery field, specialising in intellectual property, copyright and patent matters.

He was also very interested in Conservative politics. He became an Alderman of the London County Council (LCC) in the 1960s. Ware joined the Athenaeum Club in 1983, a London club. He was appointed an Officer of the Order of the British Empire (OBE) for services to the Institute of Patentees and Inventors, which he chaired for many years.

Ware retired from the Bar in 1987.

== Mensa ==
The origins of Mensa were said to be from a conversation on a train with Roland Berrill, a lawyer with an interest in phrenology. Ware argued that IQ tests were more appropriate and later tested Berrill, finding him to be in the top 1% of the population. They therefore agreed to form a High IQ club, with Berrill providing the funding, and it began on 1 October 1946.

By 1950, Ware had left Mensa, disagreeing with the way it was run by Berrill. However, after Berrill died in 1961, he re-joined the society.
