= High-IQ society =

Organization for people with a high IQ score

A high-IQ society or genius society is an organization that limits its membership to people who have attained a specified score on an IQ test, usually in the top two percent of the population (98th percentile) or above. The largest and oldest such society is Mensa International, which was founded by Roland Berrill and Lancelot Ware in 1946.

== Entry requirements ==
High-IQ societies typically accept a variety of IQ tests for membership eligibility; these include WAIS, Stanford-Binet, and Raven's Advanced Progressive Matrices, amongst many others deemed to sufficiently measure or correlate with intelligence. Tests deemed to insufficiently correlate with intelligence (e.g. post-1994 SAT, in the case of Mensa and Intertel) are not accepted for admission.

There are disagreements about appropriate tests as well as different testing environments. Mensa, Intertel, and Triple Nine accept only tests from controlled testing environments, such as university admissions exams or a psychologist's office. Some tests accepted by other organizations, such as the Mega Test, are usually self-administered, which has resulted in concerns about people cheating.

As IQ significantly above 146 SD15 (approximately three-sigma) cannot be reliably measured with accuracy due to sub-test limitations and insufficient norming, IQ societies with cutoffs significantly higher than four-sigma should be considered dubious. Experimental high-range tests used in some high-IQ society contexts have been questioned. A 2020 analysis by David Redvaldsen of Ronald K. Hoeflin's Mega and Titan tests concluded that the official scores reported to test-takers were too high.

Other tests have been criticized for relying on outdated or sexist cultural stereotypes, such as a logic puzzle that assumes women always change their family name when they marry.

== Demographics ==
Most high-IQ people do not join high-IQ societies, and there is some evidence that the people who join are not representative of high-IQ people in general. They are frequently lonely and feel like they are outsiders, and join for a sense of belonging. They often report feeling rejected socially from a young age. People who are drawn to high-IQ societies may struggle to maintain intimate relationships.

People who choose to join high-IQ societies, especially those focused on highest levels, tend not to be as successful as expected according to conventional social standards. For example, in contrast to the general expectation that being intelligent correlates with financial success, they often have relatively low-paid jobs or have difficulty obtaining and maintaining steady employment.

The skew towards many members having relatively low life success may be due to selection; that is, the over-representation of "lonely, frustrated, and socially awkward" people in high-IQ societies may be because happy, well-adjusted, middle-class people with high IQs do not seek out high-IQ societies, but the people who are not doing well do seek them out.

== Societies ==
Some societies accept the results of standardized tests taken elsewhere. Those are listed below by selectivity percentile (assuming the now-standard definition of IQ as a standard score with a median of 100 and a standard deviation of 15 IQ points). Mensa is by far the largest high-IQ society, but since the 1960s, various new groups have been founded with even stricter admissions requirements.

Ultrahigh IQ groups are frequently short-lived organizations. Their internal disagreements (e.g., over which entrance tests to accept) often result in organizations splintering. For example, the International Society for Philosophical Enquiry (previously called The Thousand, and before that, MENS) was founded to outdo The MM Society. It then split to produce the Triple Nine Society, and then the Triple Nine Society split to produce the Cincinnatus Society. Ronald K. Hoeflin has founded or co-founded seven different high-IQ societies.

Notable high-IQ societies include:

Name	Established	No. of members	Approx. no. of countries	Eligibility / Rarity	Approx. IQ
Mensa International	1946	≈ 145,000 (as of 2022)	100	Top 2 percent of population (98th percentile; 1 person out of 50)	130
Intertel	1966	≥ 1,700 (as of July 2024)	40	Top 1 percent (99th percentile; 1 out of 100)	135
Triple Nine Society	1978	≈ 1,900 (as of September 2022)	46	Top 0.1 percent (99.9th percentile; 1 out of 1,000)	146

== See also ==
- IQ classification
- Level of measurement § Ordinal scale
