= Law School Admission Council =

Nonprofit association of law schools

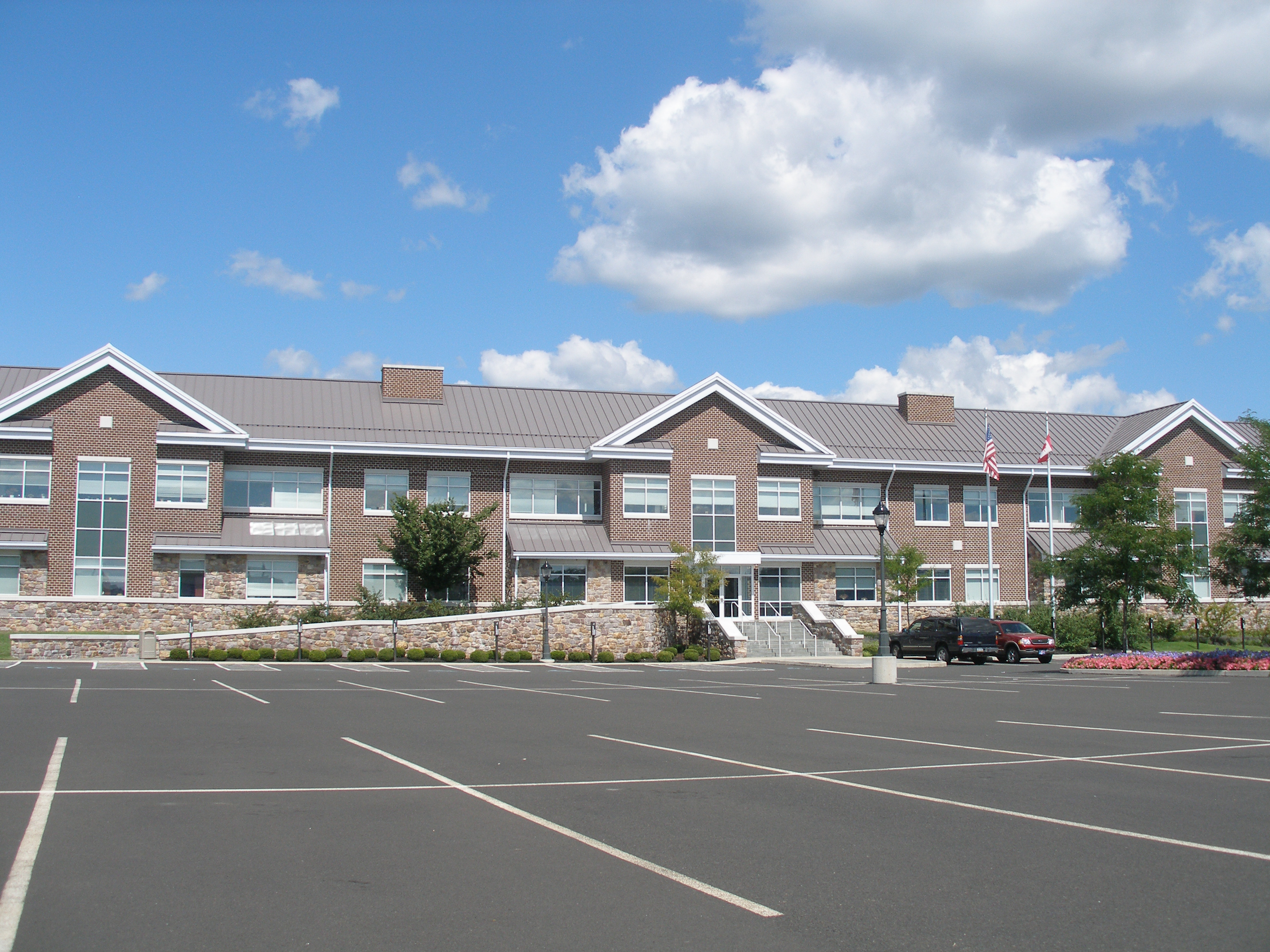
LSAC headquarters in Newtown

The Law School Admission Council (LSAC) is a nonprofit organization whose members include more than 200 law schools throughout the United States, Canada and Australia. Its headquarters are in Newtown, Pennsylvania (about 15 miles north of Philadelphia).

The Law School Admission Council (LSAC) is a nonprofit corporation that provides products and services to facilitate the admission process for law schools and their applicants worldwide. More than 200 law schools in the United States, Canada, and Australia are members of the Council. All law schools approved by the American Bar Association are LSAC members, as are Canadian law schools recognized by a provincial or territorial law society or government agency. Many nonmember law schools also use LSAC's services.

Founded in 1947, the Council is best known for administering the Law School Admission Test (LSAT), with over 150,000 tests administered annually at testing centers worldwide. In the face of pushback from members of the Law School Admission Council, some schools have begun rolling out the GRE as a testing alternative to the LSAT. LSAC processes academic credentials for an average of 85,000 law school applicants annually, provides essential software and information for admission offices and applicants, conducts educational conferences for law school professionals and prelaw advisors, sponsors and publishes research, funds diversity and other outreach grant programs, and publishes LSAT preparation books and websites and law school guides, among many other services.
