= Mensa International =

Largest and oldest high-IQ society in the world

- Formation: 1 October 1946; 80 years ago
- Legal status: Limited non-profit organisation
- Headquarters: Slate Barn, Church Lane, Caythorpe, Lincolnshire, England, United Kingdom
- Location: Worldwide
- Members: ~150,000
- International Chairperson: Robin Crawford
- Website: www.mensa.org

Mensa International is the largest and oldest high-IQ society in the world. It is a non-profit organisation open to people who score at the 98th percentile or higher on a standardised, supervised IQ or other approved intelligence test. Mensa formally comprises national groups and the umbrella organisation Mensa International, with a registered office in Caythorpe, Lincolnshire, England, which is separate from the British Mensa office in Wolverhampton.

== Etymology ==
The word mensa (/ˈmɛnsə/, Latin: [ˈmẽːs̠ä]) is Latin for 'table', as is symbolised in the organisation's logo, and was chosen to demonstrate the round-table nature of the organisation: the coming together of equals.

== History ==
Roland Berrill, a British-Australian barrister, and Lancelot Ware, a British barrister and biochemist, founded Mensa at Lincoln College, in Oxford, England in 1946, with the intention of forming a society for the most intelligent, with the only qualification being a high IQ.

The society was ostensibly to be non-political in its aims and free from all other social distinctions, such as race and religion. However, Berrill and Ware were both disappointed with the resulting society. Berrill had intended Mensa as "an aristocracy of the intellect" and was unhappy that the majority of members came from working or lower-class homes, while Ware said: "I do get disappointed that so many members spend so much time solving puzzles."

American Mensa was the second major branch of Mensa thanks to the efforts of Margot Seitelman. It was granted tax exemption in May 1965 under 501(c)(4) Civic Leagues and Social Welfare Organizations. In 2025 it reported total revenue of $5,153,487 and total assets of $13,389,688.

== Membership requirement ==
Mensa's requirement for membership is a score at or above the 98th percentile on certain standardised IQ or other approved intelligence tests, such as the Stanford–Binet Intelligence Scales. The minimum accepted score on the Stanford–Binet is 132, while for the Cattell it is 148, and 130 in the Wechsler tests (WAIS, WISC). Most IQ tests are designed to yield a mean score of 100 with a standard deviation of 15; the 98th-percentile score under these conditions is 130.8, assuming a normal distribution.

However, American Mensa does not provide a score comparable to scores on other tests; the test serves only to qualify a person for membership. In some national groups like Germany and Austria, a person may take a Mensa-offered test only once a year and only a total of three times, although one may also submit an application with results from a different qualifying test. Other national groups have less strict requirements. Nevertheless, German Mensa has the highest number of persons tested per year (4,238 from July 2024 to June 2025) among all national groups, more than twice the number of American Mensa.

The Mensa test is also available in some developing countries such as Brazil, India, Indonesia and Pakistan.

== Organisational structure ==
Countries that have a national Mensa, 2021

Mensa International consists of around 150,000 members in 90+ countries, 48 of which have their own national groups. The national groups issue periodicals, such as Mensa Bulletin, the monthly publication of American Mensa, and Mensa Magazine, the monthly publication of British Mensa. Individuals who live in a country with a national group join the national group, while those living in countries without a recognised chapter may join Mensa International directly.

The largest national groups are:

- American Mensa, with more than 40,000 members
- Mensa Germany, with more than 20,000 members
- British Mensa, with about 17,000 members in the UK and Ireland

Larger national groups are further subdivided into local groups. For example, American Mensa has 134 local groups, with the largest having over 2,000 members and the smallest having fewer than 100. German Mensa has 42 local groups, each led by a LocSec (Local Secretary).

Members may form special interest groups (SIGs) at international, national, and local levels; these SIGs represent a wide variety of interests, ranging from motorcycle clubs to entrepreneurial co-operations. Some SIGs are associated with various geographic groups, whereas others act independently of official hierarchy. There are also electronic SIGs (eSIGs), which operate primarily as email lists, where members may or may not meet each other in person.

The Mensa Foundation, a separate charitable U.S. corporation, edits and publishes its own Mensa Research Journal, in which both Mensans and non-Mensans are published on various topics surrounding the concept and measure of intelligence.

== Gatherings ==
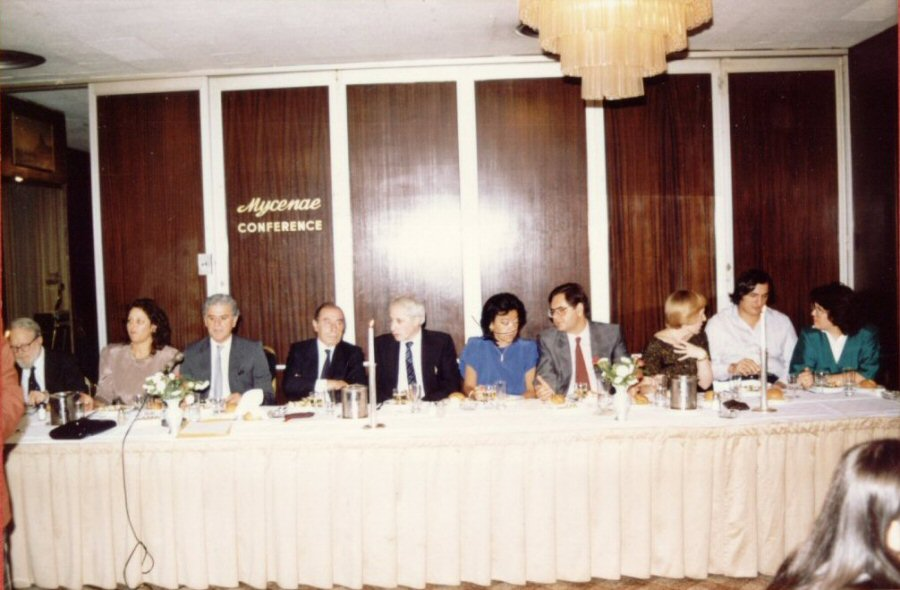
Mensa IBD meeting that took place in Athens (1988).

Mensa has many events for members, from the local to the international level. Several countries hold a large event called the Annual Gathering (AG). It is held in a different city every year, with speakers, dances, leadership workshops, children's events, games, and other activities. The American AG is usually held during the American Independence Day (4 July).

=== USA ===
Since 1990, American Mensa has sponsored the annual Mensa Mind Games competition, at which the Mensa Select award is given to five board games that are "original, challenging, and well designed".

=== Europe ===
In Europe, since 2008, international meetings have been held under the name EMAG (European Mensa Annual Gathering), starting in Cologne that year. The next meetings were in Utrecht (2009), Prague (2010), Paris (2011), Stockholm (2012), Bratislava (2013), Zürich (2014), Berlin (2015), Kraków (2016), Barcelona (2017), Belgrade (2018) and Ghent (2019). The 2020 event was postponed and took place in 2021 in Brno. The next meetings were in Strasbourg (2022), Rotterdam (2023), Bucharest (2024) and Cardiff (2025). The EMAG will be in Podgorica in 2026.

=== Asia-Pacific ===
The Asia-Pacific region has an Asia-Pacific Mensa Annual Gathering (AMAG), with rotating countries hosting the event. This has included Gold Coast, Australia (2017), Cebu, Philippines (2018), New Zealand (2019), and South Korea (2020).

== Officers ==
The governing body of Mensa International consists of:

- International Chair: Robin Crawford
- International Director – Administration: Mel Jäger
- International Director – Development: Eivind Olsen
- International Treasurer: Jovana Kostic
- International Director – Smaller National Mensas: Sorana Burcusel
- American Mensa: Jon Gruebele
- British Isles Mensa: Ann Rootkin
- Mensa Germany: Peter Fröhler

== Publications ==
All national Mensa groups publish members-only newsletters or magazines, which include articles and columns written by members, and information about upcoming Mensa events. Examples include the American Mensa Bulletin, the German MinD-Magazin, the British Mensa Magazine, Serbian MozaIQ, the Australian TableAus, the Macedonian Mensadonija, the Mexican El Mensajero, and the French, formerly Contacts, now MensaMag. Aside from national publications, some local or regional groups have their own newsletters and websites.

Mensa International publishes a Mensa World Journal, which "contains views and information about Mensa around the world". Some articles from this journal are generally included in each national magazine.

The Mensa Foundation publishes the Mensa Research Journal, which "highlights scholarly articles and recent research related to intelligence", and is also available to non-members.

== Demographics ==
All national Mensa subsidiaries accept children under the age of 18. However, some national Mensas do not test the children themselves; many offer activities, resources, and newsletters specifically geared toward gifted children and their parents. Kashe Quest, the youngest member of American Mensa; Joseph Harris-Birtill, the youngest member of British Mensa; and several Australian Mensa members joined at age two. Elise Tan-Roberts of the UK and Miranda Elise Margolis of the US are the youngest people ever to join Mensa, having gained full membership at the age of two years and four months.

In 2018, ten year old Mehul Garg became the youngest person in a decade to score the maximum of 162 on the Mensa IQ test. In 2017 Mehul's older brother had also attained the maximum score on the Mensa IQ test.

American Mensa avers that their members range "in age from 2 to 102", but no specifics are provided.

As of 2014, British Mensa reportedly had a member aged 103.

According to American Mensa's generational classifications and published demographics (as of 2023), its membership is 8 percent from the Silent generation (born 1924–1942), 37 percent Baby Boomers (born 1943–1960), 30 percent Gen-X (born 1961–1981), 10 percent Millennial (born 1982–2000), 12 percent Generation Z (born 2001–2020), and the remaining 3 percent other. The American Mensa general membership identifies as 64 percent male, 32 percent female, 3 percent unknown, and less than 1 percent gender non-conforming or other.

== Densa ==
Densa has been used as the name of a number of fictional organisations parodying Mensa International. Densa is ostensibly an organisation for people insufficiently intelligent to be members of Mensa. The name Densa has been said to be an acronym for "Diversely Educated Not Seriously Affected." The name Densa is a portmanteau of dense and Mensa.

The concept of an organisation for the mentally dense originated in Boston & Outskirts Mensa Bulletin (BOMB), August 1974, in "A-Bomb-inable Puzzle II" by John D. Coons. The puzzle involved "The Boston chapter of Densa, the low IQ society". Subsequent issues had additional puzzles with gags about the group and were widely reprinted by the bulletins of other Mensa groups before the concept of a low IQ group gained wider circulation in the 1970s, with other people creating quizzes, etc.

A humour book called The Densa Quiz: The Official & Complete Dq Test of the International Densa Society was written in 1983 by Stephen Price and J. Webster Shields.

== See also ==
- List of notable Mensans
- List of Mensa Select recipients
- IQ classification
- IQ Award
- Triple Nine Society – High IQ society
- Intertel – Second-oldest high-IQ society in the world
