= Angewandte Psychologie =

1917 book by Theodor Paul Erismann

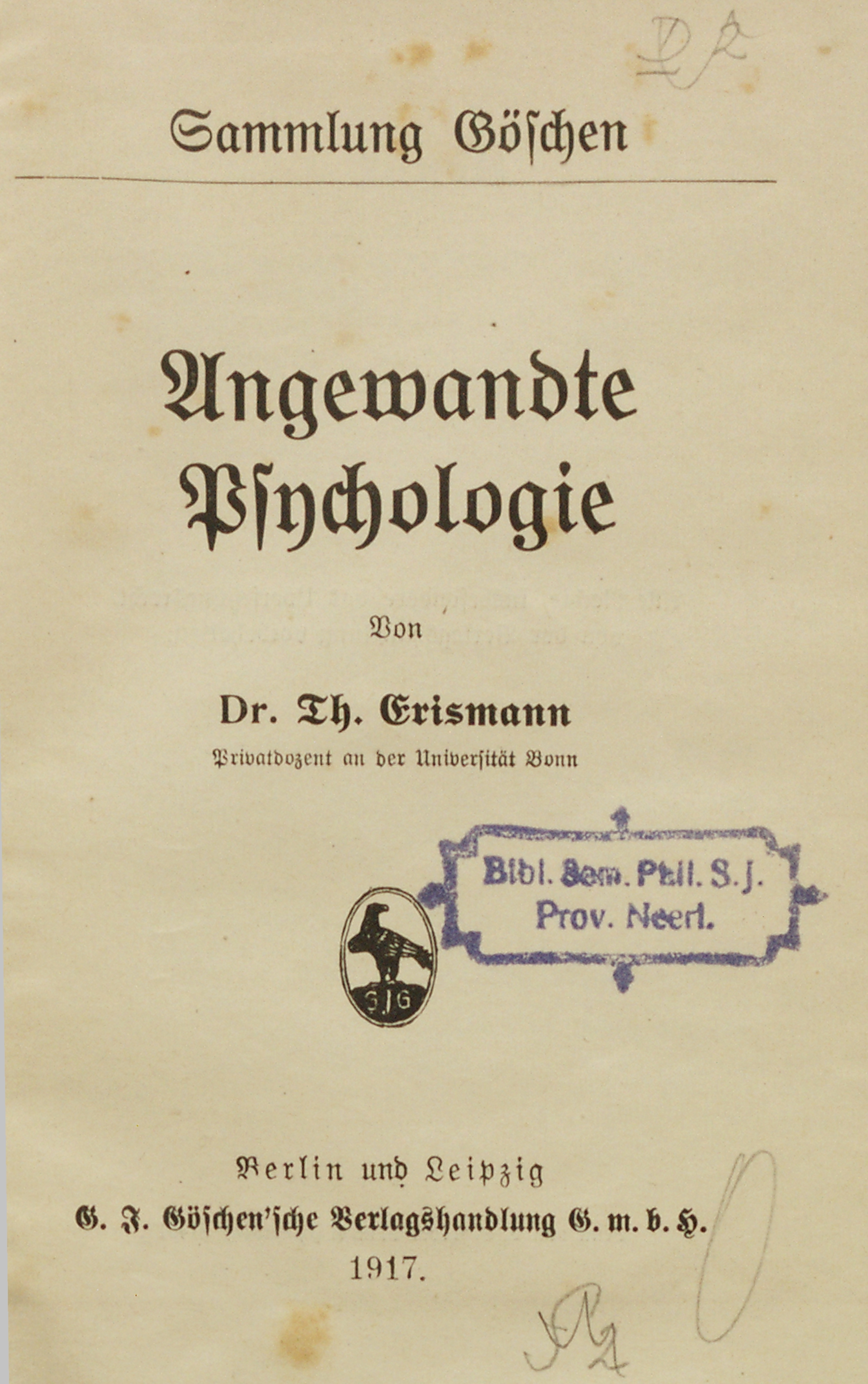
Title page of book

The book Angewandte Psychologie (English: Applied Psychology), by the Swiss-Austrian psychologist and philosopher Theodor Paul Erismann, was published in 1917 in Berlin and Leipzig. It discusses major topics concerning school, work, law and their connections to psychology. The book aims at giving a short overview of how psychology can be applied to important areas in life. Erismann uses many applicable tests and describes them in great detail, thus providing a practical guideline on how to use the findings of psychology in different fields.

== Context ==
The book was published during the First World War. The war is not mentioned in the book and there are no references that could be linked to the war. Angewandte Psychologie happens to be a book for a layman person who is eager to learn something about the latest contributions of psychology to different areas in life. Erismann was greatly influenced by Wilhelm Wundt and his experimental approach to psychology. During Erismann's time, psychology was a fairly new topic itself. Psychology gained popularity through Wilhelm Wundt who is also called "the father of experimental psychology" and founded the first formal laboratory for psychological research at the University of Leipzig. Thus, Erismann adapted techniques and methods by Wundt to create and develop his own research. He therefore contributed important insights and findings to psychology.

== Content ==
The book consists of 5 chapters. Those 5 chapters all discuss distinct topics and their connection to applied psychology.

1. Choice of work and the experimental-psychological testing of cognitive abilities (original title: "Berufswahl und die experimentell-psychologische Prüfung geistiger Fähigkeiten"): This chapter mainly describes why people choose their work and whether those choices fit to their personality. Erismann illustrates with a few examples people who were lucky to find something they love doing, but also considers people who work at jobs they do not like and they are not good at. In this chapter, a guideline is provided on how to find something one is good at through the help of "experimental-psychological testing".

2. The school and the experimental-psychological testing of children (original title: "Die Schule und die experimentell-psychologische Untersuchung der Kinder"): In the second chapter, Erismann explains why it is of pivotal importance to already test children while they are still in school in regard to their cognitive abilities. Through using intelligence tests like the Stanford-Binet Intelligence Scale introduced by Alfred Binet and Théodore Simon, teachers can help their pupils to understand at a fairly young age what skills they possess and where their interests lie. Erismann points out that it is important to establish institutes that are specialized in placing people in suitable jobs concerning their interests, skills, and abilities. Those institutes should use specific tests based on experimental-psychological testing. Thus, reminding us of career centres which can nowadays be found in almost every city. An example of such a career centre would be the German "Bundesagentur für Arbeit".

3. Psychology and the law (original title: "Die Psychologie und das Recht"): The "Psychology and the law" chapter summarizes the findings of forensic psychology and how this knowledge can be applied in court. Erismann furthermore describes false memories and that they are not happening seldom but on a regular basis. Therefore, judges need to be aware of this phenomenon. Back then psychologists already examined the reliability of eyewitnesses' testimonies through different tests, e.g. the "Association-Test" (original name: Assoziationstest). Nowadays, the reliability of eyewitness testimonies often is questioned by the public and the law; hence, a lot of research regarding reliability of eyewitnesses' testimonies is being conducted. In Erismann's book, the viewpoint that children are not as reliable as adult eyewitnesses and more suggestible to false cues is supported. However, nowadays it is found that adults can be as suggestible to false memories as children. Sometimes, children even seem to be more reliable eyewitnesses than adults.

4. Psychology and the science of language (original title: "Die Psychologie und die Sprachwissenschaften"): The fourth chapter is rather a short one and illustrates how language and psychology can be combined. Erismann bases his explanations about linguistics on the "Analogiegesetz" (English: "The Law of Analogies"). This law describes the development of words and how some words seem to be more similar to each other than other words. Based on this law, people tend to build analogies between words and place them in similar categories having similar accentuations, an equal number of letters, et cetera. Erismann further explains that the phenomena of misspeaking a word or saying two separate words as one are a result of the law of analogies.

5. The importance of suggestion and hypnosis regarding other fields of knowledge and the practical implications for life (original title: "Suggestion und Hypnose in ihrer Bedeutung für die andern Wissensgebiete und das praktische Leben"): The last chapter deals with the suggestibility of human beings and how this is related to hypnosis. Some people are more easily hypnotised than others. If one succeeded to hypnotise someone else, the hypnotised person might be suggestible. The hypnotist is able to change and shape opinions, experiences, and events of other people and let the hypnotised people believe that the implanted memories are their own. This can be a powerful and a dangerous tool. Erismann also explains that suggestibility and "implanting" beliefs into the mind of other people is not only happening through hypnosis but can also happen if a charismatic leader is able to influence the masses. Erismann's field of expertise includes crowd psychology. Crowd psychology describes phenomena like the Second World War, especially Adolf Hitler's speeches, as well as when Martin Luther King Jr. mobilised the masses to march peacefully against racism and hate. The first event is a negative example of how one single person can influence the masses, whereas the second event a positive example.

== Reception ==
Theodor Erismann has been a rather popular psychologist during his life. He researched a lot on the topic of eyesight and blindness, especially with his colleague Ivo Kohler. Ivo Kohler himself wrote Erismann's memorial, which is published on the webpage of the University of Innsbruck where Erismann mainly worked during his academic career. His findings of the "Goggle Experiments" are still highly influential and relevant today. He published around a dozen books, which found great appreciation. Furthermore, Erismann was elected as the president of the Academic Society for Psychotherapy and Applied Psychology which thus underlines his great influence for psychology during his time.

Erismann was not only perceived as a psychologist, but also as a philosopher. As Kohler put it himself:

"Man würde aber Erismann unrecht tun, ihn nur als einen originellen Experimentator und Empiriker zu feiern, er war ein ebenso interessierter und leidenschaftlicher Philosoph." (Loose translation in English: "Rather to only celebrate Erismann as an original researcher and empiricist, it is important to be aware that he was also an interested and passionate philosopher").
