= 1911 census of Ireland =

Census of Irish population, part of UK census 1911

- 2 April 1911
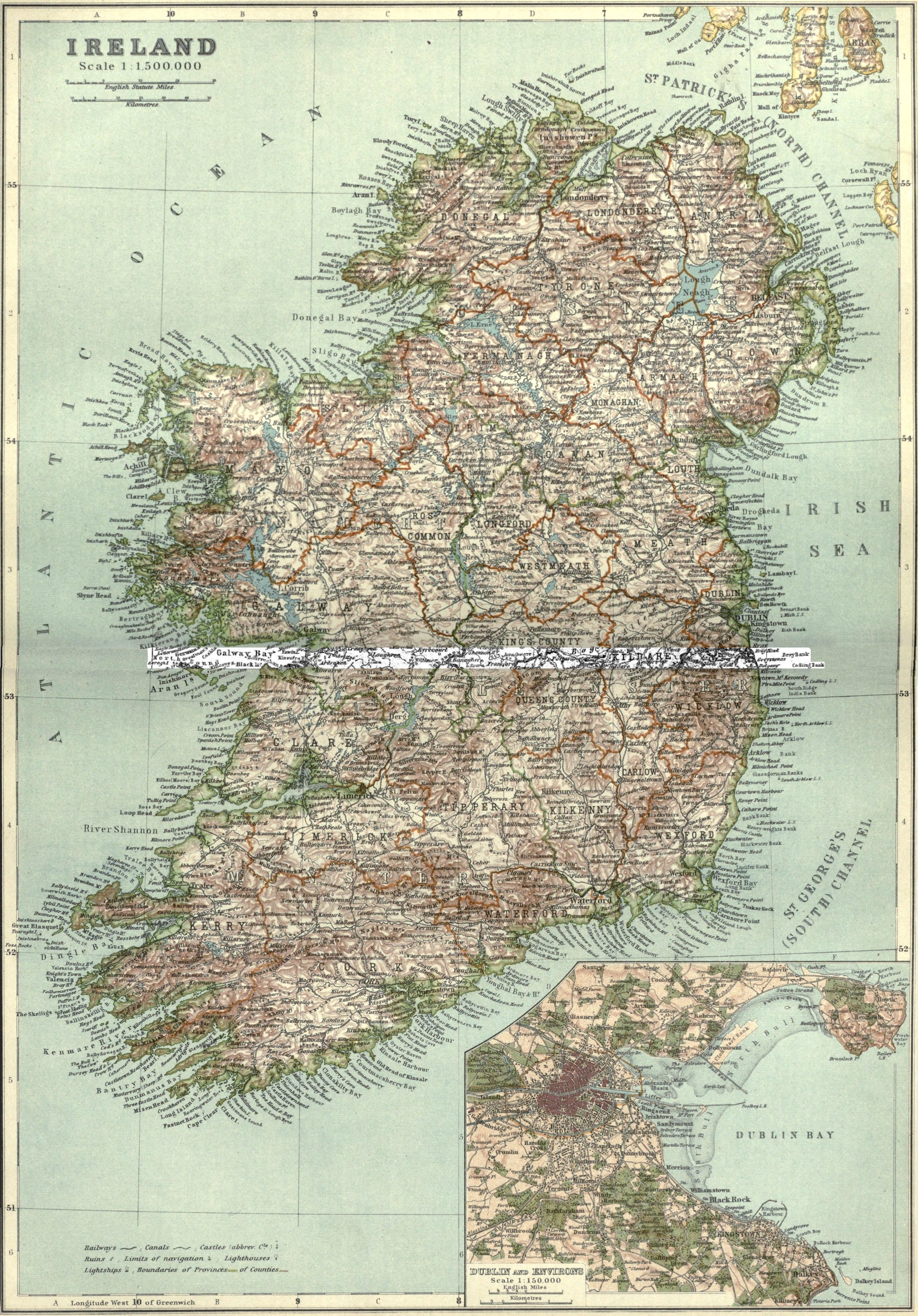
- Map of Ireland (1911)

General information
- Country: Ireland

Results
- Total population: 4,390,219 (▼ -1.52%)
- Most populous county: Antrim (480,016)
- Least populous county: Carlow (36,252)

The 1911 census of Ireland was the last census that covered the whole island of Ireland. Censuses were taken at ten-year intervals from 1821 onwards, but the 1921 census was cancelled due to the Irish War of Independence.

Most of the original records of the 1821 to 1851 censuses were destroyed by fire at the Four Courts in Dublin during the Irish Civil War, and those that survive can be searched on the National Archives website. Those of 1861 and 1871 were destroyed soon after collection, and those of 1881 and 1891 were pulped during the First World War. The 20th-century and 21st-century censuses survive in full - the 1901 and 1911 census were put online in 2009 by the National Archives of Ireland, followed on 18 April 2026 by the census of 1926.

== Information collected ==
The census information was recorded on the following forms:

- Form A, which was completed by the head of the family
- Forms B1, B2, and N, which were completed by the census enumerator

=== Head of the family ===
Form A, which was completed by the head of the family, contained the following information for each person in the home on the night of 2 April:

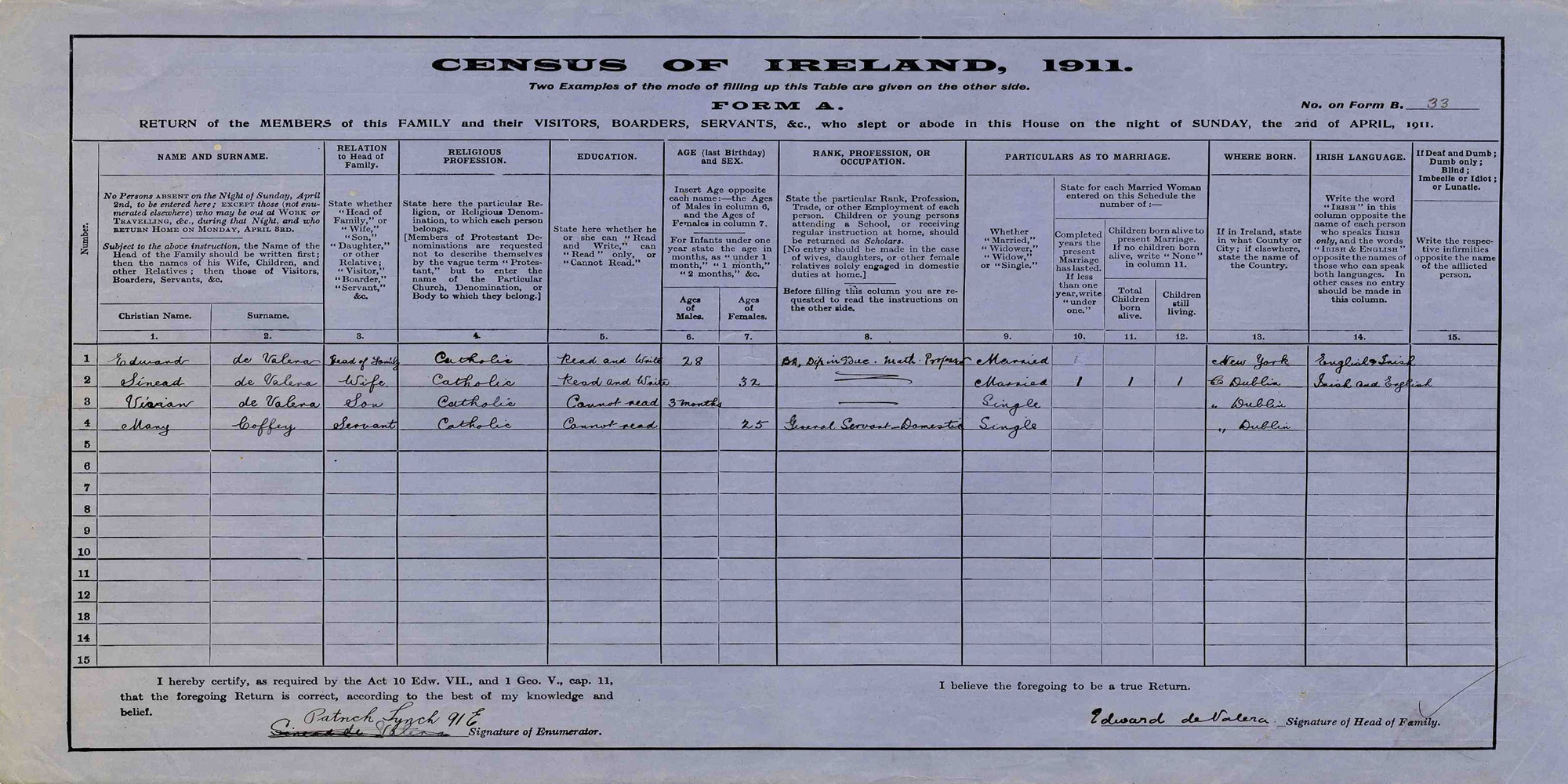
Census of Ireland, 1911: Form A

- Name and Surname
- Relation to Head of Family
- Religious Profession (Protestants were requested to indicate denomination)
- Education (whether able to read and write)
- Age (last birthday) and Sex
- Rank, Profession, or Occupation
- Particulars as to Marriage (marital status, length of marriage, number of children born alive, number of children still living)
- Where Born
- Irish Language (whether able to speak Irish)
- Disability: if persons were:
  - Deaf and Dumb
  - Dumb only
  - Blind
  - Imbecile or Idiot (i.e. intellectually disabled)
  - Lunatic (i.e. severely mentally ill)

The form was signed by both the census enumerator and the head of the family.

=== Census enumerator ===
Form B1, which was known as the House and Building Return, was completed by the enumerator and summarised the following administrative information for the street or townland, or part thereof:

- County
- Parliamentary Division
- Poor Law Union
- District electoral division
- Townland
- Parliamentary borough
- City
- Urban District
- Town or Village
- Street
- Barony
- Parish

It then summarised the following information pertaining to the houses and families of the street or townland. The information about houses included:

- Number of House or Building
- Whether Built or Building
- Whether Private Dwelling, Public Building, School, Manufactory, Hotel, Public-house, Lodging-house, Shop, etc.
- Number of Out-Offices and Farm-steadings as returned on Form B2
- Whether House Inhabited
- Walls (whether made of permanent or perishable material)
- Roof (whether made of permanent or perishable material)
- Rooms (number, whether 1, 2–4, 5–6, 7–9, 10–12, 13+)
- Windows in Front (exact number)
- Class of House (1st, 2nd, 3rd, or 4th, based on information supplied above)

The information about families included:

- Number of distinct Families in each House
- Name of the Head of each Family residing in the House
- Number of Rooms occupied by each Family
- Total Number of Persons in each Family
- Date on which Form A was collected
- Number of Persons in each Family who were sick on 2 April 1911
- Name of the Landholder (if any) on whose Holding the House is situated
- Number on Form M1 if House is on the Holding of a Landholder

Form B2, the Return of Outhouses and Farm-Steadings, gave more detailed information on secondary buildings attached to a property, such as outhouses, workshops, and various kinds of farm buildings.

Form N, the Enumerator's Abstract for a Townland or Street, recorded the enumerator's name, the same administrative information as listed for Form B1, the properties and which were inhabited, and the numbers of families, males, and females, and persons of each religious denomination.

== Population ==
=== Total ===
The total population of Ireland according to the 1911 census was 4,390,219 of whom 2,192,048 were male and 2,198,171 were female.

=== By province ===
Province	Flag	Irish name	Population (1911)	Density (km^{2})	Counties
Connaught	Connacht	Connachta; Cúige Chonnacht	610,984	34.5	5
Leinster	Leinster	Laighin; Cúige Laighean	1,162,044	58.7	12
Munster	Munster	Mumhain; Cúige Mumhan	1,035,495	42.0	6
Ulster	Ulster	Ulaidh; Cúige Uladh	1,581,696	71.7	9

=== By county ===
Rank	County	Population	Density (km^{2})	Province	Change since previous census
1	Antrim*	480,016	156	Ulster	4.5%
2	Dublin	477,196	518	Leinster	6.5%
3	Cork	392,104	52	Munster	-3.1%
4	Down*	305,098	123	Ulster	2.8%
5	Mayo	192,177	34	Connaught	-3.5%
6	Galway	182,224	30	Connaught	-5.4%
7	Donegal	168,537	35	Ulster	-2.4%
8	Kerry	159,691	33	Munster	-3.6%
9	Tipperary	152,433	35	Munster	-4.9%
10	Limerick	143,069	52	Munster	-2.1%
11	Tyrone	142,665	44	Ulster	-5.2%
12	Londonderry	140,625	66	Ulster	-2.6%
13	Armagh	120,291	91	Ulster	-4.1%
14	Clare	104,232	30	Munster	-7.2%
15	Wexford	102,273	43	Leinster	-1.8%
16	Roscommon	93,956	37	Connaught	-7.7%
17	Cavan	91,173	47	Ulster	-6.5%
18	Waterford	83,966	45	Munster	-3.7%
19	Sligo	79,045	43	Connaught	-6.0%
20	Kilkenny	74,962	36	Leinster	-5.3%
21	Monaghan	71,455	55	Ulster	-4.2%
22	Kildare	66,627	39	Leinster	4.8%
23	Meath	65,091	28	Leinster	-3.6%
24	Louth	63,665	77	Leinster	-3.3%
25	Leitrim	63,582	40	Connaught	-8.3%
26	Fermanagh	61,836	37	Ulster	-5.5%
27	Wicklow	60,711	30	Leinster	-0.2%
28	Westmeath	59,986	33	Leinster	-2.7%
29	King's County	56,832	28	Leinster	-5.6%
30	Queen's County	54,629	32	Leinster	-4.9%
31	Longford	43,820	40	Leinster	-6.1%
32	Carlow	36,252	40	Leinster	-4.0%
Total	Ireland	4,390,219	52		-1.52%
	Average	137,194			

*Note: The County Borough of Belfast, established in 1888, straddled the border between Down and Antrim. The River Lagan was the traditional boundary of the two counties. The borough of Belfast had 15 wards, three of which - Ormeau, Pottinger and Victoria - were south of the Lagan and have been included as part of County Down's population. The remainder have been added to County Antrim's population.

=== Cities ===
City	Population
Belfast	386,947
Dublin	304,802
Cork	76,673
Derry	40,780
Limerick	38,518
Waterford	27,464
Galway	13,255

== Religion ==
According to the 1911 census, religious profession broke down as follows:

Religious profession	Number	Percentage
Roman Catholic	3,238,656	73.8%
Church of Ireland	575,489	13.1%
Presbyterian	439,876	10.0%
Methodist	61,806	1.4%
Other Christian denominations	57,718	1.3%
Jewish	5,101	0.1%

== Viewing the returns ==
The census returns of 1911 for all 32 counties are available online. The website is freely accessible, with no charge for viewing any of the material.

The original manuscripts of the Census of Ireland are all housed in the National Archives of Ireland. The returns are arranged by townland for rural areas and by street in cities, and it is necessary to know the townland or street where a person lived and its corresponding district electoral division to find the record of a particular person of interest.

The Family History Library also holds microfilm copies of the original 1911 census returns and these can be viewed at the Library in Salt Lake City, Utah. A list of Royal Irish Constabulary police barracks, for which the Form H Barrack Returns can be identified, is available at the free to use Royal Irish Constabulary Research Forum.

== See also ==
- Census in the United Kingdom
- List of United Kingdom censuses
- Irish Population Analysis
