= Feeble-minded =

Term once used in psychiatry to describe people with intellectual disabilities

The term feeble-minded was used from the late 19th century in Europe, the United States, and Australasia for disorders later referred to as illnesses, deficiencies of the mind, and disabilities.

At the time, mental deficiency encompassed all degrees of educational and social deficiency. Within the concept of mental deficiency, researchers established a hierarchy, ranging from idiocy, at the most severe end of the scale; to imbecility, at the median point; and to feeble-mindedness at the highest end of functioning. The last was conceived of as a form of high-grade mental deficiency.

The development of the ranking system of mental deficiency has been attributed to Sir Charles Trevelyan in 1876, and was associated with the rise of eugenics. The term and hierarchy had been used in that sense at least 10 years previously.

During this time, institutions for individuals labeled as feeble-minded grew due to rising social concern and changes in education.

== History ==
The earliest recorded use of the term in the English language dates from 1534, when it appears in one of the first English translations of the New Testament, the Tyndale Bible. A biblical commandment to "Comforte the feble mynded" is included in 1 Thessalonians.

A London Times editorial of November 1834 describes the long-serving former Prime Minister Lord Liverpool as a "feeble-minded pedant of office".

In the United States, The Association of Medical Officers of American Institutions for Idiotic and Feebleminded Persons (AMO) was established in 1876 as a professional organization for institution superintendents. Over time, it broadened its membership to include various professionals interested in the welfare of individuals with intellectual disabilities, marking a significant step toward fostering support for this community.

=== Schools of feeble-minded in the United States ===
From 1876 to 1916, facilities for individuals with intellectual disabilities became a recognized aspect of American society, showcasing significant changes in education, social dynamics, healthcare, and scientific shifts during that period. The rise in schools for students with intellectual disabilities since the 1900s reflects the growing commitment from cities, states, and private organizations to support these children, rather than an increase in the occurrence of mental disabilities.

For "feebleminded" children, which broadly connoted mental deficiency of various forms, special day-schools were established in the 1900s to promote efficient schooling. These schools focused on "educable" learning-disabled children, which classified children on two axes: a child's abnormality (need for special education) and a child's ineducability. For most families, institutions were places of last, not first, resort.

Some small, private establishments opened during the late 1800s, and early 1900s, such as the Pennsylvania Training School for Idiotic and Feeble-Minded Children, generally known as "Elwyn." Elwyn Institution provided a mix of short-term education and long-term care to residents with diversely ranging mental and physical disabilities.

Children in these institutions expanded their vocabulary, and learned their letters and numbers. If they were capable, they later progressed to study basic reading and writing skills.

==== Institutional daily life ====
At institutions, there were a variety of engaging activities to energize and stimulate the mind while diverting the "melancholic. For example, the Private Institution for the Education of Feeble-Minded youth in Barre, Massachusetts built cottages for each of the children's needs. These cottages were similar to spaces in other institutions, with large sitting and living rooms, "modern conveniences" (sanitation), a shop room with tool benches, recreation classes, and indoor games. When they were not learning basic reading and writing, it was common for residents to participate in unpaid domestic labor.

==== Sterilization and eugenics in school settings ====
Sterilizations for those characterized as feeble-minded was legal and common during 1927 to 1945. At the Minnesota School for the Feeble Minded in Faribault, 18-year old Edna Collins became the ninety-eighth person legally sterilized in 1927. The sterilizations for the fertile feebleminded were driven by fear of these individuals' impact on the economy and social order. However, sterilizations were not a safe and effective substitute for permanent segregation and control.

==== Partial list of US institutions in the late 19th and early 20th centuries ====
- Partlow State School for Mental Defectives founded in 1919 located in Tuscaloosa, Alabama
- Florida Farm Colony for Epileptic and Feeble-Minded founded in 1921 located in Gainesville, Florida
- State Institute for the Feeble-Minded founded in 1860 located in Frankfort Kentucky
- Pennsylvania Training School for Idiotic and Feeble-Minded Children, established in 1852 and located in Elwyn, Pennsylvania
- Private Institution for the Education of Feeble-Minded Youth founded in 1851 and located in Barre, Massachusetts.
- Faribault School for the Feeble-Minded founded in 1879 and located in Faribault, Minnesota.

== Definition ==
The British government's Royal Commission on the Care and Control of the Feeble-Minded (1904–1908), in its Report in 1908 defined the feeble-minded as:

[P]ersons who may be capable of earning a living under favourable circumstances, but are incapable from mental defect, existing from birth or from an early age: (1) of competing on equal terms with their normal fellows, or (2) of managing themselves and their affairs with ordinary prudence.

Despite being pejorative, in its day the term was considered, along with idiot, imbecile, and moron, to be a relatively precise psychiatric classification.

The American psychologist Henry H. Goddard, who coined the term moron, and translated the Stanford-Binet intelligence test into English, was the director of the Vineland Training School (originally the Vineland Training School for Backward and Feeble-minded Children) at Vineland, New Jersey. Goddard was known for strongly postulating that "feeble-mindedness" was a hereditary trait, most likely caused by a single recessive gene. Goddard rang the eugenic "alarm bells" in his 1912 work, The Kallikak Family: A Study in the Heredity of Feeble-Mindedness, about those in the population who carried the recessive trait despite outward appearances of normality.

In the first half of the 20th century, a diagnosis of "feeble-mindedness, in any of its grades" was a common criterion for many states in the United States, which embraced eugenics as a progressive measure, to mandate the compulsory sterilization of such patients. In the 1927 US Supreme Court case Buck v. Bell, Justice Oliver Wendell Holmes closed the 8–1 majority opinion upholding the sterilization of Carrie Buck, with the phrase, "Three generations of imbeciles are enough." Buck, her mother and daughter were all classified as feeble-minded. Between 1927 and 1945, up to 2,204 individual's in Minnesota (77 percent of whom were women) underwent sterilization due to the states eugenic law, which remained in effect for another 30 years.

== Representation in other media ==
Jack London published a short story, "Told in the Drooling Ward" (1914), which describes inmates at a California institution for the "feeble-minded". He narrates the story from the point of view of a self-styled "high-grade feeb". The California Home for the Care and Training of Feeble-minded Children, later the Sonoma Developmental Center, was located near the Jack London Ranch in Glen Ellen, California.

== See also ==
- Eugenics in the United States
- Insanity
- Developmental disorder
- State schools for people with disabilities
