= Jerome Sattler =

American educational psychologist (1931–2024)

- Born: Jerome Murray Sattler; March 3, 1931; New York City, New York, U.S.
- Died: November 16, 2024 (aged 93)
- Education: City College of New York; University of Kansas
- Known for: Intelligence testing in children
- Awards: American Psychological Foundation Gold Medal Award for Life Achievement in the Application of Psychology (2005)
- Scientific career
- Fields: Clinical and school psychology
- Institutions: San Diego State University
- Thesis: A Study of Embarrassment (1959)

Jerome Murray Sattler (March 3, 1931 – November 16, 2024) was an American clinical psychologist who was Professor Emeritus and adjunct professor of psychology at San Diego State University. He was known for his work regarding intelligence testing in children, including his role in developing the fourth edition of the Stanford-Binet Intelligence Scale in 1986, along with R. L. Thorndike and Elizabeth Hagan. He was also the author of the widely used school psychology textbook Assessment of Children. In 2022, he published Foundations of Behavioral, Social, and Clinical Assessment of Children, 7th edition. In 2024, he published Assessment of Children: Cognitive Foundations and Applications, 7th edition. Sattler died om November 14, 2024, at the age of 93.

== Education and academic career ==
A native of New York City, Sattler earned his B.A. from the City College of New York in 1952. He then enrolled in graduate school at the University of Kansas, where he received his M.A. and Ph.D. in psychology in 1953 and 1959, respectively. He was a clinical psychology diplomate of the American Board of Professional Psychology. He retired from the San Diego State University faculty in 1994, after teaching there for 29 years.

== Influence ==
According to a 2002 article in Learning and Individual Differences, "Perhaps no two persons have had as much impact on the practice of intelligence testing in schools in the last 30 years as Jerome Sattler and Alan Kaufman."

== Honors and awards ==
Sattler was a fellow of the American Psychological Association. In 1998, he received the Senior Scientist Award from the American Psychological Association's Division of School Psychology. In 2003, he received an honorary Doctor of Science degree from Central Missouri State University. In 2005, he received the Gold Medal Award for Life Achievement in the Application of Psychology from the American Psychological Foundation. In 2006, he received the San Diego Psychological Association's Distinguished Contribution to Psychology Award. In 2015, he received The 1949 Award from the University of Kansas Clinical Psychology Program in recognition of being a distinguished alumni for his outstanding contributions to clinical psychology. In 2018, he received the Commemorative Medallion—“Semper Discentes et Adservientes” (Always Learning and Serving)—from the College of Psychology, Nova Southeastern University. In 2023, he received the 2024 ABPP Distinguished Service to the Profession Award.
