= Lewis Terman =

American educational psychologist, academic, and eugenicist (1877–1956)

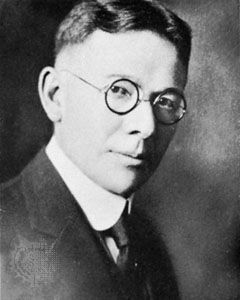
- Born: Lewis Madison Terman; January 15, 1877; Johnson County, Indiana, U.S.
- Died: December 21, 1956 (aged 79); Palo Alto, California, U.S.
- Education: Clark University (Ph.D., 1905); Indiana University Bloomington (B.A, M.A., 1903); Central Normal College (B.S., B.Pd., 1894; B.A., 1898)
- Known for: IQ testing, psychology of talent, eugenics
- Scientific career
- Fields: Psychology
- Institutions: Stanford University; Los Angeles Normal School
- Doctoral students: Harry Harlow

Lewis Madison Terman (January 15, 1877 – December 21, 1956) was an American psychologist, academic, and proponent of eugenics. He was noted as a pioneer in educational psychology in the early 20th century at the Stanford School of Education. Terman is best known for his revision of the Stanford–Binet Intelligence Scales and for initiating the longitudinal study of children with high IQs called the Genetic Studies of Genius. As a prominent eugenicist, he was a member of the Human Betterment Foundation, the American Eugenics Society, and the Eugenics Research Association, believing in genetic racial associations with intelligence. Terman also served as president of the American Psychological Association. A Review of General Psychology survey published in 2002 ranked Terman as the 72nd most cited psychologist of the 20th century, in a tie with G. Stanley Hall.

== Background ==
Terman was born in Johnson County, Indiana, the son of Martha P. (Cutsinger) and James William Terman. He received a Bachelor of Science, BPd (Bachelor of Pedagogy), and Bachelor of Arts from Central Normal College in 1894 and 1898, and a BA and Master of Arts from the Indiana University Bloomington in 1903. He received his PhD from Clark University in 1905.

He worked as a school principal in San Bernardino, California in 1905, and as a professor at Los Angeles Normal School in 1907. In 1910, he joined the faculty of Stanford University as a professor of educational psychology at the invitation of Ellwood Patterson Cubberley and remained associated with the university until his death. He served as chairman of the psychology department from 1922 to 1945.

His son, Frederick Terman, is widely credited with being the father of Silicon Valley.

== Achievement ==
=== IQ testing ===
Terman published the Stanford Revision of the Binet-Simon Intelligence Test in 1916 and revisions were released in 1937 and 1960. Original work on the test had been completed by Alfred Binet and Théodore Simon of France. Terman promoted his test – the "Stanford-Binet" – as an aid for the classification of developmentally disabled children. Early on, Terman adopted William Stern's suggestion that mental age/chronological age times 100 be made the intelligence quotient or IQ. Later revisions adopted David Wechsler's cohort-norming of IQ.

Revisions (most recently the fifth) of the Stanford-Binet remain in widespread use as a measure of general intelligence for both adults and for children.

The first mass administration of IQ testing was done with 1.7 million soldiers during World War I, when Terman served in a psychological testing role with the United States military. Terman was able to work with other applied psychologists to categorize army recruits. The recruits were given group intelligence tests which took about an hour to administer. Testing options included Army Alpha, a text-based test, and Army Beta, a picture-based test for nonreaders. 25% could not complete the Alpha test. The examiners scored the tests on a scale ranging from "A" through "E".

Recruits who earned scores of "A" would be trained as officers while those who earned scores of "D" and "E" would never receive officer training. The work of psychologists during the war proved to Americans that intelligence tests could have broader utility. After the war Terman and his colleagues pressed for intelligence tests to be used in schools to improve the efficiency of growing American schools.

=== Origins of ability ===
Terman followed J. McKeen Cattell's work which combined the ideas of Wilhelm Wundt and Francis Galton saying that those who are intellectually superior will have better "sensory acuity, strength of grip, sensitivity to pain, and memory for dictated consonants". At Clark University, Terman wrote his doctoral dissertation entitled Genius and stupidity: a study of some of the intellectual processes of seven "bright" and seven "stupid" boys. He administered Cattell's tests on boys who were considered intelligent versus boys who were considered unintelligent.

Unlike Binet and Simon, whose goal was to identify less able school children in order to aid them with the needed care required, Terman proposed using IQ tests to classify children and put them on the appropriate job-track. He believed IQ was inherited and was the strongest predictor of one's ultimate success in life.

=== Psychology of talent ===
Terman's study of genius and gifted children was a lifelong interest. His fascination with the intelligence of children began early in his career since he was familiar with Alfred Binet's research in this area.

Through his studies on gifted children, Terman hoped first, to discover the best educational settings for gifted children and, second, to test and dispel the negative stereotypes that gifted children were "conceited, freakish, socially eccentric, and [insane]".

Previously, the research looking at genius adults had been retrospective, examining their early years for clues to the development of talent. With Binet's development of IQ tests, it became possible to quickly identify gifted children and study them from their early childhood into adulthood. In his 1922 paper called A New Approach to the Study of Genius, Terman noted that this advancement in testing marked a change in research on geniuses and giftedness.

Terman found his answers in his longitudinal study on gifted children: Genetic Studies of Genius. Initiated in 1921, the Genetic Studies of Genius was from the outset a long-term study of gifted children. Published in five volumes, Terman followed children with extremely high IQ in childhood throughout their lives. The fifth volume examined the children in a 35-year follow-up, and looked at the gifted group during mid-life.

Genetic Studies of Genius revealed that gifted and genius children were in at least as good as average health and had normal personalities. Few of them demonstrated the previously held negative stereotypes of gifted children. He found that gifted children did not fit the existing stereotypes often associated with them: they were not weak and sickly social misfits, but in fact were generally taller, in better health, better developed physically, and better adapted socially than other children. The children included in his studies were colloquially referred to as "Termites". The gifted children thrived both socially and academically. In relationships, they were less likely to divorce. Additionally, those in the gifted group were generally successful in their careers: Many received awards recognizing their achievements. Though many of the children reached exceptional heights in adulthood, not all did. Terman explored the causes of obvious talent not being realized, exploring personal obstacles, education, and lack of opportunity as causes.

Terman died before he completed the fifth volume of Genetic Studies of Genius, but Melita Oden, a colleague, completed the volume and published it. Terman wished for the study to continue on after his death, so he selected Robert Richardson Sears, one of the many successful participants in the study as well as a colleague of his, to continue with the work. The study is still supported by Stanford University and will continue until the last of the "Termites" withdraws from the study or dies.

==== Role of complex tasks in developing potential ====
In 1915, he wrote a paper called The mental hygiene of exceptional children. He pointed out that though he believed the capacity for intelligence is inherited, those with exceptional intelligence also need exceptional schooling. Terman wrote that "[bright children] are rarely given tasks which call forth their best ability, and as a result they run the risk of falling into lifelong habits of submaximum efficiency". In other words, nature (heredity) plays a large role in determining intelligence, but nurture (the environment) is also important in fostering the innate intellectual ability. By his own admission, there was nothing in his own ancestry that would have led anyone to predict him to have an intellectual career.

== Legacy ==
During his lifetime, Terman was an elected Member of the United States National Academy of Sciences, the American Academy of Arts and Sciences, and the American Philosophical Society.

From 1957 until 2018, a middle school was named after Terman and his son Frederick Terman. However, in 2018, the school board of the Palo Alto Unified School District unanimously decided to rename the school in honor of former Palo Alto City Councilwoman Ellen Fletcher after Terman's involvement with the eugenics movement came to the attention of parents and the school board.

Frederick Terman, as provost of Stanford University, greatly expanded the science, statistics and engineering departments that helped catapult Stanford into the ranks of the world's first class educational institutions, as well as spurring the growth of Silicon Valley. Stanford University has an endowed professorship in his honor.

== Eugenics ==
Terman came to believe that IQ was, in addition to dependent on education, highly heritable.

Terman was a member of numerous American eugenic organizations, and listed in their rosters as a leader. For example, the Eugenical News (1916), publication of the leading Eugenic Records Office noted that the newly formed American Eugenic Organization included the following top American psychologists as its members:

new active members of Eugenics Research Association… C. C. Brigham, Psychological Laboratory, Princeton, New Jersey, G. Stanley Hall, Clark University, C. E. Seashore, State University of Iowa, Lewis, M. Terman, Stanford University, California, John B. Watson, Johns Hopkins Hospital.

— page 53

Terman's wide-scale IQ testing exposed him to diverse groups of test-takers. Administering the tests to Spanish-speakers and unschooled African-Americans from the Southwest, he concluded:

High-grade or border-line deficiency... is very, very common among Spanish-Indian and Mexican families of the Southwest and also among negroes. Their dullness seems to be racial, or at least inherent in the family stocks from which they come... Children of this group should be segregated into separate classes... They cannot master abstractions but they can often be made into efficient workers... from a eugenic point of view they constitute a grave problem because of their unusually prolific breeding

Terman's work in addition to other openly eugenic psychologists and education scholars such as Edward Thorndike, Leta Hollingworth, Carl Brigham, and H. H. Goddard contributed to long standing policies and practices of racial school segregation.

In this same book, Terman further stated that eugenics was important in the study of intelligence because "considering the tremendous cost of vice and crime…it is evident that psychological testing has found here one of its richest applications". He further insisted that human "dullness... seems to be racial, or at least inherent in the family" and found with "extraordinary frequency among Indians, Mexicans, and negroes".

Testing other groups in California, he observed:

Perhaps a median IQ of 80 for Italian, Portuguese, and Mexican school children in the cities of California would be a liberal estimate. How much of this inferiority is due to the language handicap and to other environmental factors it is impossible to say, but the relatively good showing made by certain other immigrant groups similarly handicapped would suggest that the true causes lie deeper than environment.

The suggestions of a significant role for genetics in IQ led Terman to later join the Human Betterment Foundation, a Pasadena-based eugenics group founded by E. S. Gosney in 1928 which had as part of its agenda the promotion and enforcement of compulsory sterilization laws in California. Stern et al. (2017) documented significant long-standing violence inflicted on those identified by eugenicists as unfit and sterilized.

A modern-day assessment of Terman's contributions concluded:

Lewis Terman was a man of his less-than-enlightened time. He believed in eugenics, and his research project was called "Genetic Studies of Genius." He naively assumed that his high IQ kids (nearly all white) would become the future leaders of science, industry, and politics. His inclusion of girls was an important exception to the biases of the era, since women had only just gotten the right to vote, and had few career options. However, Terman was above all a scientist; and he was dedicated to collecting meaningful data, and to accepting what the data showed even when it contradicted his beliefs.

== Publications ==
- The Measurement of Intelligence (1916)
- The Use of Intelligence Tests (1916)
- The Intelligence of School Children: How Children Differ in Ability, the Use of Mental Tests in School Grading, and the Proper Education of Exceptional Children (1919)
- The Stanford Achievement Test (1923)
- Genetic Studies of Genius (1925, 1947, 1959)
- Autobiography of Lewis Terman (1930)

== Partial bibliography ==
- Terman, Lewis M. (December 1915). "The Mental Hygiene of Exceptional Children". The Pedagogical Seminary. 22 (4): 529–537. doi:10.1080/08919402.1915.10533983. hdl:10192/27397.
- Terman, L. M. (1922). "A New Approach to the Study of Genius". Psychological Review. 29 (4): 310–318. doi:10.1037/h0071072.
- Terman, L.M. (Ed.). (1959). The gifted group at mid-life. Stanford, California: Stanford University Press.

== See also ==
- Cognitive epidemiology
- Aptitude
- Eugenics in the United States

== References and further reading ==
- Chapman, Paul Davis. (1988) Schools as Sorters: Lewis M. Terman, Applied Psychology, and the Intelligence Testing Movement, 1890-1930 (New York: New York University Press.)
- Minton, Henry L. (1988) Lewis M. Terman: Pioneer in Psychological Testing (New York: New York University Press.
- Vialle, W. (1994). 'Termanal' science? The work of Lewis Terman revisited. Roeper Review, 17(1), pages 32–38.
- Human Intelligence: Lewis Madison Terman
- Autobiography of Lewis M. Terman. First published in Murchison, Carl. (Ed.) (1930). History of Psychology in Autobiography (Volume 2, pages 297–331). Republished by the permission of Clark University Press, Worcester, Massachusetts.
- Memorial Resolution Lewis Madison Terman via Stanford University
- Lippmann, Walter. (1922). "The Mental Age of Americans". New Republic, 32 (412–417), 213–215, 246–248, 275–277, 297–298, 328–330, 9–11.
