= Retard (pejorative) =

Pejorative term for one with a mental disability

- Ableist slur
- Part of speech: Noun
- Pronunciation: pronounced /ˈɹiː.tɑːɹd/
- Etymology: From Latin verb retardare
- Meaning: Intellectually disabled people (pejorative)

In typical usage, retard (pronounced /ˈɹiː.tɑːɹd/, REE-tard) is a term used for a foolish person. The word has widely been considered an ableist slur, especially when used for someone with intellectual disability. The adjective retarded is used in the same way, for something or someone considered very foolish or stupid. The word is sometimes censored and referred to as the euphemistic "r‑word" or "r‑slur".

Retard was previously used as a medical term. The verb "to retard" means 'to delay or hold back', and so "retard" became known as a medical term in the late 19th and early 20th centuries to describe children with intellectual disabilities, or retarded mental development. For context, until the 1960s, the terms moron, idiot, cretin, and imbecile were all genuine, non-offensive terms used, including by psychiatrists, to refer to people with mental/intellectual disabilities and low intelligence. These words were discontinued in that form when concerns arose that they had developed negative meanings, with "retard" and "retarded" replacing them. After that, the terms "handicapped" (United States) and "disabled" (United Kingdom) replaced "retard" and "retarded". Disabled is now considered a more polite term than handicapped in the United States as well. This trend was dubbed a "euphemism treadmill" by Steven Pinker.

== Etymology ==
The word retard dates as far back as 1426. It stems from the Latin verb retardare, meaning "to hinder" or "make slow". The English language, along with other European ones, adopted the word and used it as similar meaning, slow and delayed. In English, the word "to decelerate" would become a more common term than "to retard", while in others like French or Catalan, retard is still in common usage to mean "delay" (tard).

== Modern use ==
Retard has transitioned from an impartial term to one that is negatively loaded. For this reason, the term is now widely considered as degrading even when used in its original context.

Much like today's socially acceptable terms idiot and moron, which are also defined as some sort of mental disability, when the term retard is being used in its pejorative form, it is usually not being directed at people with intellectual disabilities. Instead, people use the term when teasing their friends or as a general insult.

On January 6, 2025, Elon Musk sent a post on X (formerly Twitter) containing the slur. The Montclair State University published a study pointing to a 207.5% increase in posts on the site containing the word retard following Musk's post.

In May 2025, CNN noted that the word was "surging in popularity online among some celebrities and their fans," and quoted Joe Rogan as saying, "The word ‘retarded’ is back, and it's one of the great culture victories."

== Legislation in the United States ==
In 2010 the U.S. Congress passed S. 2781, a legislative act known as Rosa's Law. The act amended the language "mental retardation" in existing federal laws, to "mental disability."

"Mentally retarded individual" was also changed to "an individual with an intellectual disability". The goal of this change in phrasing was to remove language that may be considered derogatory to communities.

== See also ==
- Spread the Word
- List of disability-related terms with negative connotations
