= Elizabeth Kite (historian) =

American historian (1864–1954)

Elizabeth Sarah Kite
- Born: 1864; Philadelphia, Pennsylvania
- Died: 6 January 1954 (aged 89–90); Wilmington, Delaware
- Occupation: Historian
- Awards: Chevalier de la Légion d'honneur

Elizabeth Kite (1864–6 January 1954) was an American historian specializing in Franco-American history.

== Life and work ==
Elizabeth Sarah Kite was born in 1864 to a Quaker family in Philadelphia, Pennsylvania. She attended a Quaker boarding school in West Chester, Pennsylvania and then studied abroad for six years, during which time she converted to Catholicism. When she returned to the United States, Kite taught in private schools in three different states. From 1912 to 1918, she participated in psychological research at the Vineland Training School for Feeble-Minded Girls and Boys in Vineland, New Jersey. She helped to research the psychologist and eugenicist Henry H. Goddard's seminal book The Kallikak Family: A Study in the Heredity of Feeble-Mindedness in which Goddard argued that variety of mental traits were hereditary and society should limit reproduction by people possessing these traits. Kite also translated a book by the French psychologists, Alfred Binet and Théodore Simon, The Intelligence of the Feeble-minded (French: L'intelligence des imbecile) in 1916. During this time, she began researching Franco-American topics and published Beaumarchais and the War of American Independence in 1917. A dozen years later she wrote L’Enfant and Washington, and in 1931, Correspondence of General Washington and Compte de Grasse was published. Two years later Kite wrote Lebegre Duportail, Comdt. of Engineers, 1777–1783. In 1934, she wrote Lafayette and His Companions in the Victorie, followed by The Catholic Part in the Making of America two years later. Kite was instrumental in placing photostats of documents from the French Revolution in the Library of Congress, for which she was awarded the Légion d’honneur in the grade of Chevalier. Kite died in Wilmington, Delaware on 6 January 1954.
