= Mental age =

Concept relating to intelligence

The pruning process is shown in this clip that was constructed from MRI scans of healthy children and adolescents. The time-lapse animation compresses 15 years of brain development (ages 5–20) into just a few seconds. Red indicates more gray matter, blue less gray matter. The changes in color from yellow/red to blue show the pruning process (source: NIMH).

Mental age is a concept related to intelligence and maturity. It looks at how a specific individual, at a specific age, performs intellectually, compared to average intellectual performance for that individual's actual chronological age (i.e. time elapsed since birth). The intellectual performance is based on performance in tests and live assessments by a psychologist. The score achieved by the individual is compared to the median average scores at various ages, and the mental age (x, say) is derived such that the individual's score equates to the average score at age x.

However, mental age depends on what kind of intelligence is measured. For instance, a child's intellectual age can be average for their actual age, but the same child's emotional intelligence can be immature for their physical age. Psychologists often remark that girls are more emotionally mature than boys at around the age of puberty. Also, a six-year-old child intellectually gifted can remain a three-year-old child in terms of emotional maturity.

Mental age is a controversial concept that has been labeled by some disabled activists, advocates, and researchers as inaccurate, reductive, or infantilizing.

== History ==
=== Early theories ===
During much of the 19th century, theories of intelligence focused on measuring the size of human skulls. Anthropologists well known for their attempts to correlate cranial size and capacity with intellectual potential were Samuel Morton and Paul Broca.

The modern theories of intelligence began to emerge along with experimental psychology. This is when much of psychology was moving from philosophical to more biology and medical science basis. In 1890, James Cattell published what some consider the first "mental test". Cattell was more focused on heredity rather than environment. This spurs much of the debate about the nature of intelligence.

Mental age was first defined by the French psychologist Alfred Binet, who introduced the Binet-Simon Intelligence Test in 1905, with the assistance of Theodore Simon. Binet's experiments on French schoolchildren laid the framework for future experiments into the mind throughout the 20th century. He created an experiment that was designed as a test to be completed quickly and was taken by children of various ages. In general, older children performed better on these tests than younger ones. However, the younger children who had exceeded the average of their age group were said to have a higher "mental age", and those who performed below that average were deemed to have a lower "mental age". Binet's theories suggested that while mental age was a useful indicator, it was by no means fixed permanently, and individual growth or decline could be attributed to changes in teaching methods and experiences.

Henry Herbert Goddard was the first psychologist to bring Binet's test to the United States. He was one of the many psychologists in the 1910s who believed intelligence was a fixed quantity. While Binet believed this was not true, the majority of those in the USA believed it was hereditary.

=== Modern theories ===
The limitations of the Stanford-Binet caused David Wechsler to publish the Wechsler Adult Intelligence Scale (WAIS) in 1955. These two tests were split into two different ones for children. The WAIS-IV is the known current publication of the test for adults. The reason for this test was to score the individual and compare it to others of the same age group rather than to score by chronological age and mental age. The fixed average is 100 and the normal range is between 85 and 115. This is a standard currently used and is used in the Stanford-Binet test as well.

Recent studies showed that mental age and biological age are connected.

== Mental age and IQ ==
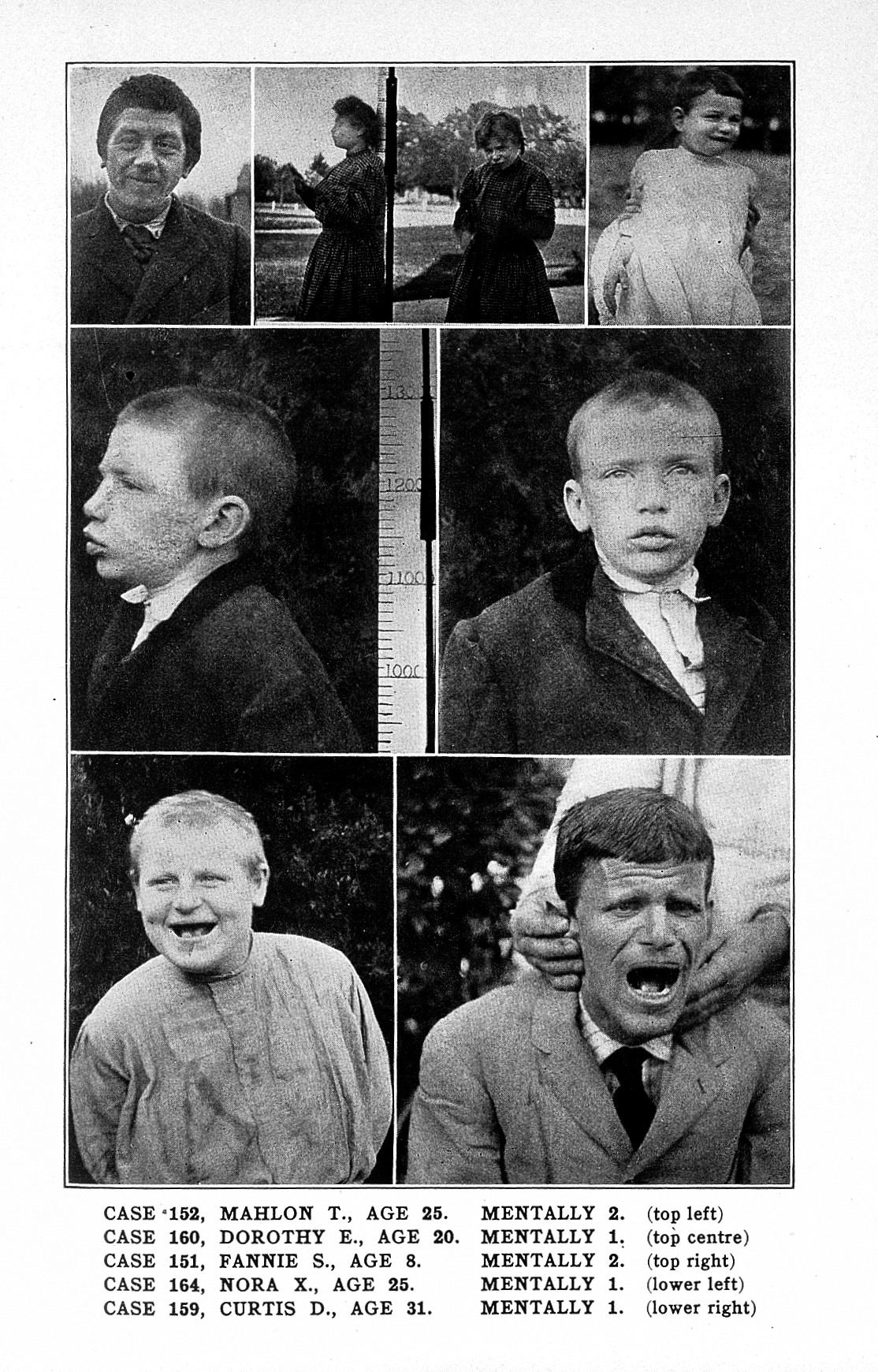
Intellectually disabled patients with 1- and 2-year-old mental ages

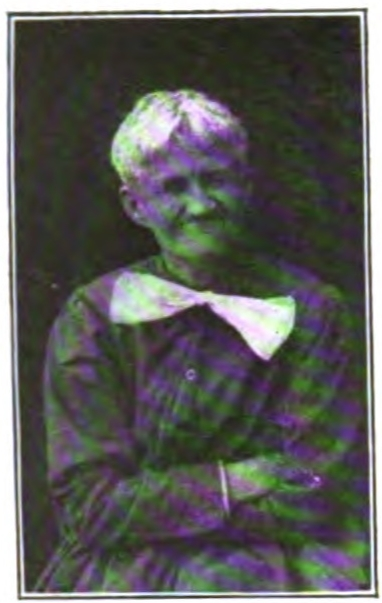
A 78-year-old intellectually disabled woman whose "mental condition has always been that of a child 5 or 6 years of age"

Modern intelligence tests, such as the current Stanford-Binet test, no longer compute the IQ using the above "ratio IQ" formula. Instead, the results of several different standardized tests are combined to derive a score. This score reflects how far the person's performance deviates from the average performance of others who are the same age, arbitrarily defined as an average score of 100. An individual's "deviation IQ" is then estimated, using a more complicated formula or table, from their score's percentile at their chronological age. But at least as recently as 2007, older tests using ratio IQs were sometimes still used for a child whose percentile was too high for this to be precise, or whose abilities may exceed a deviation IQ test's ceiling.

In original IQ tests, a child's IQ was roughly estimated using the formula: $\quad \mathrm{IQ} = \frac{\mathrm{mental\;age}}{\mathrm{chronological\;age}} \cdot 100$

== Controversy ==
Measures such as mental age and IQ have limitations. Binet did not believe these measures represented a single, permanent, and inborn level of intelligence. He stressed that intelligence overall is too broad to be represented by a single number. It is influenced by many factors such as the individual's background, and it changes over time.

Throughout much of the 20th century, many psychologists believed intelligence was fixed and hereditary while others believed other factors would affect intelligence.

After World War I, the concept of intelligence as fixed, hereditary, and unchangeable became the dominant theory within the experimental psychological community. By the mid-1930s, there was no longer agreement among researchers on whether or not intelligence was hereditary. There are still recurring debates about the influence of environment and heredity upon an individual's intelligence.

In a 1926 research paper, psychologist L.L. Thurstone labeled the concept of mental age "a failure" that led to "ambiguities and inconsistencies."

In the 21st century, some disabled activists, advocates, and researchers have labeled the concept of mental age inaccurate, reductive, or infantilizing and argued for the use of the term to be discontinued.

== See also ==
- IQ
- Mature minor doctrine
