= Imbecile =

Archaic psychiatric term to denote intellectual disability

The term imbecile was once used by psychiatrists to denote a category of people with moderate to severe intellectual disability, as well as a type of criminal. The word arises from the Latin word imbecillus, meaning weak, or weak-minded. It originally referred to people of the second order in a former and discarded classification of intellectual disability, with a mental age of three to seven years and an IQ of 25–50, above "idiot" (IQ below 25) and below "moron" (IQ of 51–70). In the obsolete medical classification (ICD-9, 1977), these people were said to have "moderate mental retardation" or "moderate mental subnormality" with IQ of 35–49, as they are usually capable of some degree of communication, guarding themselves against danger and performing simple mechanical tasks under supervision.

The meaning was further refined into mental and moral imbecility. The concepts of "moral insanity", "moral idiocy", and "moral imbecility" led to the emerging field of eugenic criminology, which held that crime can be reduced by preventing "feeble-minded" people from reproducing.

"Imbecile" as a concrete classification was popularized by psychologist Henry H. Goddard and was used in 1927 by United States Supreme Court Justice Oliver Wendell Holmes Jr. in his ruling in the forced-sterilization case Buck v. Bell, 274 U.S. 200 (1927).

The concept is closely associated with psychology, psychiatry, criminology, and eugenics. However, the term imbecile quickly passed into vernacular usage as a derogatory term. It fell out of professional use in the 20th century in favor of mental retardation.

Phrases such as "mental retardation", "mentally retarded", and "retarded" are also subject to the euphemism treadmill: initially used in a medical manner, they gradually took on derogatory connotation. This had occurred with the earlier synonyms (for example, moron, imbecile, cretin, and idiot, formerly used as scientific terms in the early 20th century). Professionals searched for connotatively neutral replacements. In the United States, "Rosa's Law" changed references in many federal statutes to "mental retardation" to refer instead to "intellectual disability".
