= Learning and Individual Differences =

- Discipline: Education
- Language: English

Publication details
- Publisher: Elsevier

Standard abbreviations
- ISO 4: Learn. Individ. Differ.

Indexing
- ISSN: 1041-6080

Links
- Journal homepage

Learning and Individual Differences (ISSN 1041-6080) is a quarterly peer-reviewed academic journal published by Elsevier dealing with individual differences within an educational context. It was established in 1989 with H. Lee Swanson as its founding editor. The current (as at March 2024) editor-in-chief is Samuel Greiff, (University of Luxembourg). According to the Journal Citation Reports, the journal has a 2020 impact factor of 3.139.
