= Moron (psychology) =

Old term for mild intellectual disability

Moron is a term once used in psychology and psychiatry to denote mild intellectual disability. The term was closely tied with the American eugenics movement. Once the term became popularized, it fell out of use by the psychological community, as it was used more commonly as an insult than as a psychological term. It is similar to imbecile and idiot.

== Origin and uses ==
"Moron" was coined in 1910 by US psychologist Henry H. Goddard from the Ancient Greek word μωρός (moros), which meant "dull" and used to describe a person with a mental age in adulthood of between 7 and 10 on the Binet scale. It was once applied to people with an intelligence quotient (IQ) of 51–70, being superior in one degree to imbecile (IQ of 26–50) and superior in two degrees to idiot (IQ of 0–25). The word moron, along with others including "idiotic", "imbecilic", "stupid", and "feeble-minded", was formerly considered a valid descriptor in the psychological community, but it is now deprecated in use by psychologists.

In the obsolete medical classification (ICD-9, 1977), morons and feeble-minded persons were said to have "mild mental retardation", "mild mental subnormality" or "high-grade defect" with IQ in the range 50–70.

Following opposition to Goddard's attempts to popularize his ideas, Goddard recanted his earlier assertions about the moron: "It may still be objected that moron parents are likely to have imbecile or idiot children. There is not much evidence that this is the case. The danger is probably negligible."

== See also ==
- Congenital iodine deficiency syndrome
- Eugenics in the United States
- Euphemism treadmill
