= H. Lee Swanson =

- Education: Westmont College
- Alma mater: California State University
- Known for: Distinguished Professor in the Graduate School of Education
- Scientific career
- Fields: Education
- Workplaces: University of California, Riverside

H. Lee Swanson has been a Research Professor, Educational Psychology at the University of New Mexico since 2017. He was a Distinguished Professor in the Graduate School of Education at the University of California, Riverside from 1991 to 2017 and since 2017 has been an Emeritus Professor at UCR. He was the editor of the Journal of Learning Disabilities from (approx) 2005 until 2017 and is the author of numerous academic publications in the areas of working memory, learning disabilities, cognition, intelligence, and achievement. Between 1976 and 2011, he authored or contributed to over 224 academic books and articles, including The Handbook of Learning Disabilities and his contributions to the National Center for Learning Disabilities, making him an influential researcher in the field of education.

Swanson earned his B.A. in sociology/psychology from Westmont College (California), his M.A. in educational psychology from California State University (Los Angeles), and his Ph.D. in educational psychology from the University of New Mexico. He also completed post-doctoral work at the University of California, Los Angeles.
