= Intelligence and personality =

Studies into the ties between these aspects

Intelligence and personality have traditionally been studied as separate entities in psychology, but more recent work has increasingly challenged this view. An increasing number of studies have recently explored the relationship between intelligence and personality, in particular the Big Five personality traits.

== General relationship ==
Intelligence and personality have some common features; for example, they both follow a relatively stable pattern throughout the whole of one's life, and are to some degree genetically determined. In addition, they are both significant predictors of various outcomes, such as educational achievement, occupational performance, and health. The traditional view in psychology, which was that personality and intelligence should be studied as strictly separate entities, has come under scrutiny in light of modern personality research.

Historically, psychologists have drawn a hard distinction between intelligence and personality, arguing that intelligence is a cognitive trait while personality is non-cognitive. However, modern psychologists argue that intelligence and personality are intertwined, noting that personality traits tend to be related to specific cognitive patterns. For example, neuroticism is a personality trait that is related to rumination and compulsive thinking about possible threats. Similarly, agreeableness is a personality trait that is related to the consideration of others' mental states. The finding that IQ predicts work performance, academic achievement, and health might also point to a link between intelligence and personality, or else be grounds for further research into their relationship.

Intelligence and personality are typically not tested in the same way. Intelligence is assessed using ability tests (such as IQ tests), whereas personality is assessed using questionnaires. It has been suggested that intelligence should reflect an individual's maximal performance, while personality should reflect their typical behaviour.

== By personality trait ==
=== Openness ===
Openness shows the strongest positive relationship with g (general intelligence) among the Big Five personality traits. The main meta-analytic estimates of correlations have ranged from .17 to .23. Individuals with a high level of openness enjoy the experience of learning and prefer an intellectually stimulating environment. Meta-analytic research shows that openness is more strongly related to crystallized intelligence (r = .25) than with fluid intelligence (r = .17).

Some psychologists have recently pointed out that previous instruments used to measure openness actually assessed two distinctive aspects. The first is intellect, which reflects intellectual engagement and perceived intelligence and is marked by ideas, while the second is emotion, which reflects the artistic and contemplative qualities related to being engaged in sensation and perception and is marked by fantasy, aesthetics, feelings and actions. Intelligence is more strongly related to intellectual engagement than with interest in aesthetics and fantasy. On this basis, intellect was found to be associated with the neural system of the working memory, which is related to g, whereas openness was not. In addition, according to a behavioral genetics study, intellect is genetically closer to intelligence than openness.

=== Neuroticism ===
Neuroticism has a meaningful negative correlation with intelligence. The main large meta-analyses have obtained correlations around r = −.09. Debate exists about the extent to which the correlation reflects a substantive relationship or issues with measurement. Researchers have noted that neuroticism is correlated with test anxiety, which refers to the psychological distress experienced by individuals prior to, or during, an evaluative situation. As such, some researchers have argued that neuroticism leads to test anxiety and under performance on cognitive tests. However, other researchers have argued that test anxiety is mostly incidental and caused by neuroticism, contextual pressures, and lower cognitive ability.

According to the results of a longitudinal study conducted by Gow et al., (2005), neuroticism influences an age-related decline in intelligence and there is a small negative correlation between neuroticism and a change in the level of IQ (r = −.18). Although it is still debatable if neuroticism reduces general intelligence, this study provided some valuable evidence and a direction for research. In addition, some interaction between intelligence and neuroticism has been found. Individuals with a high level of neuroticism demonstrated a poor performance, health, and adjustment only if they had a low level of intelligence. Therefore, intelligence may act as a buffer against the negative effects of neuroticism in individuals.

=== Conscientiousness ===
The association between conscientiousness and intelligence is complex and uncertain. Some researchers theorize that people with lower levels of intelligence compensate for their lower level of cognitive ability by being more structured and effortful. While some studies have obtained negative correlations, others have not. In particular, the largest current meta-analysis of 369 studies (n = 345,165) obtained a correlation of r = .01 though numerous aspect and facet level relations emerged, especially with sub-dimensions of intelligence (e.g., .32 for the industriousness aspect with general mental ability, .20 for order facet with visual processing, .39 for dependability with social studies knowledge).

Furthermore, some interaction has been found between conscientiousness and intelligence. Conscientiousness has been found to be a stronger predictor of safety behaviour in individuals with a low level of intelligence than in those with a high level. This interaction may also be found in educational and occupational settings in future studies. Therefore, relatively speaking, an increase in either conscientiousness or intelligence may compensate for a deficiency in the other.

=== Extraversion ===
The largest current meta-analyses have found few correlations between overall extraversion and intelligence (e.g., corrected r = -.02 with general mental ability based on 502 effect sizes and 393,929 people). However, within extraversion are numerous aspects and facets. For example, the activity facet, which displayed positive, meaningful relations with memory, visual processing, and processing speed abilities (e.g., .25 with ideational fluency) as well as the spectrum of acquired knowledge constructs (e.g., .28 with general verbal information).

There are some moderating variables in the relationship between extraversion and g including differences in the assessment instruments and samples' age and sensory stimulation; for example, no meaningful correlation was found between extraversion and intelligence in the samples of children. Furthermore, Bates and Rock (2004) used Raven's matrices and found that extraverts performed better than introverts with increasing auditory stimulation, whereas introverts performed best in silence. This result is consistent with that of Revelle et al. (1976).

=== Agreeableness ===
Meta-analytic research suggests that agreeableness and intelligence are uncorrelated at the global level. However, some components of agreeableness have been found to be related to cognitive abilities. For example, aggression is negatively associated with intelligence (r is around −.20) because unintelligent people may experience more frustration, which may lead to aggression and aggression and intelligence may share some biological factors. The largest meta-analyses of cognitive ability and personality trait aggression have found negligible connections. In addition, emotional perception and emotional facilitation, which are also components of agreeableness, have been found to be significantly correlated with intelligence. This may be because emotional perception and emotional facilitation are components of emotional intelligence and some researchers have found that emotional intelligence is a Second-Stratum Factor of g. Similarly, meta-analysis suggests that the related trait of honesty-humility is also uncorrelated with intelligence. On the other hand, the largest meta-analyses and agreeableness traits and cognitive abilities have found numerous links. For example, the aspects of agreeableness (i.e., compassion and politeness) have meaningful and opposite relations with cognitive abilities. For example, compassion correlates .26 with general mental ability whereas politeness correlates -.22 with general science knowledge. Facets of agreeableness also demonstrate some meaningful connections with various cognitive abilities (e.g., cooperation and processing speed correlate .20, modesty and ideational fluency correlate -.17).
