= Alfred Binet =

French psychologist, IQ test developer (1857–1911)

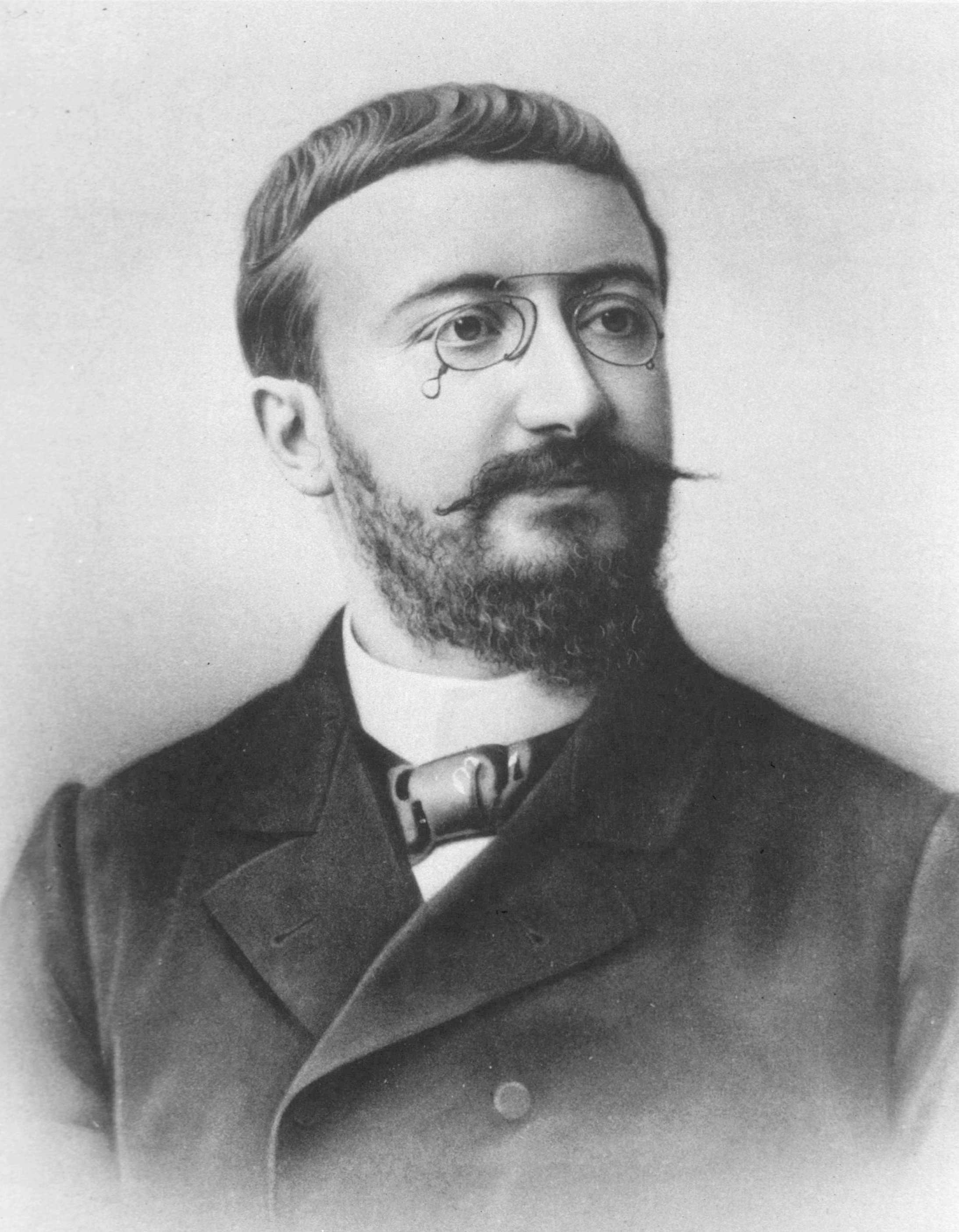
- Born: Alfredo Binetti; 8 July 1857; Nice, Kingdom of Sardinia
- Died: 18 October 1911 (aged 54); Paris, France
- Education: University of Paris
- Known for: Stanford–Binet Intelligence Scales; Binet–Simon Intelligence Test
- Spouse: Laure Balbiani
- Scientific career
- Fields: Psychology
- Workplaces: Salpêtrière Hospital; École pratique des hautes études
- Doctoral advisor: Édouard-Gérard Balbiani
- Other academic advisors: Jean-Martin Charcot; Théodule-Armand Ribot
- Notable students: Théodore Simon

Alfred Binet (/bɪˈneɪ/; French: [binɛ]; 8 July 1857 – 18 October 1911), born Alfredo Binetti, was a French psychologist who together with Théodore Simon invented the first practical intelligence test, the Binet–Simon Intelligence Test. In 1904, Binet took part in a commission set up by the French Ministry of Education to decide whether school children with learning difficulties should be sent to a special boarding school attached to a lunatic asylum, as advocated by the French psychiatrist and politician Désiré-Magloire Bourneville, or whether they should be educated in classes attached to regular schools as advocated by the Société libre pour l'étude psychologique de l'enfant (SLEPE) of which Binet was a member. There was also debate over who should decide whether a child was capable enough for regular education. Bourneville argued that a psychiatrist should do this based on a medical examination. Binet and Simon wanted this to be based on objective evidence. This was the beginning of the IQ test. A preliminary version was published in 1905. The full version was published in 1908, and slightly revised in 1911, just before Binet's death.

== Biography ==
=== Education and early career ===
Binet was born as Alfredo Binetti in Nice, which was then part of the Kingdom of Sardinia until its annexation by the Second French Empire in 1860, and the ensuing policy of Francization.

Binet attended law school in Paris, and received his degree in 1878. He also studied physiology at the Sorbonne. His first formal position was as a researcher at a neurological clinic, Salpêtrière Hospital, in Paris from 1883 to 1889. From there, Binet went on to being a researcher and associate director of the Laboratory of Experimental Psychology at the Sorbonne from 1891 to 1894. In 1894, he was promoted to being the director of the laboratory until 1911 (his death). Binet also educated himself by reading psychology texts at the National Library in Paris. He soon became fascinated with the ideas of John Stuart Mill, who believed that the operations of intelligence could be explained by the laws of associationism. Binet eventually realized the limitations of this theory, but Mill's ideas continued to influence his work.

In 1883, years of unaccompanied study ended when Binet was introduced to Charles Féré who introduced him to Jean-Martin Charcot, the director of a clinic called La Salpêtrière, Paris. Charcot became his mentor and in turn, Binet accepted a position at the clinic, working in the neurological laboratory.

At the time of Binet's tenure, Charcot was experimenting with hypnotism and Binet, influenced by Charcot, published four articles about his work in this area. Binet aggressively supported Charcot's position which included the belief that people with weakened, unstable nervous systems were susceptible to hypnosis.

Binet and Féré discovered what they called transfer and they also recognized perceptual and emotional polarization. Binet and Féré thought their findings were a phenomenon and of utmost importance.

Unfortunately, the conclusions of Charcot, Binet and Féré did not stand up to the professional scrutiny of Joseph Delboeuf, who concluded that the findings were due to the fact that the patients knew what was expected, what should happen, and they just agreed. Binet felt obliged to make an embarrassing public admission that he had been wrong in supporting his teacher. Nevertheless, he had established his name internationally in the field, Morton Prince for example stating in 1904 that, "certain problems in subconscious automatism will always be associated with the names of Breuer and Freud in Germany, Janet and Alfred Binet in France."

Still, this failure took a toll on Binet. In 1890, he resigned from La Salpêtrière and never mentioned the place or its director again. He turned to the study of child development spurred on by the birth of his two daughters, Marguerite and Alice, born in 1885 and 1887. Binet called Alice a subjectivist and Marguerite an objectivist, and developing the concepts of introspection and externospection in an anticipation of Carl Jung's psychological types. In the 21-year period following his shift in career interests, Binet "published more than 200 books, articles, and reviews in what now would be called experimental, developmental, educational, social, and differential psychology." Bergin and Cizek (2001) suggest that this work may have influenced Jean Piaget, who later studied with Binet's collaborator Théodore Simon in 1920. Binet's research with his daughters helped him to further refine his developing conception of intelligence, especially the importance of attention span and suggestibility in intellectual development.

A job presented itself for Binet in 1891 at the Laboratory of Physiological Psychology at the Sorbonne. He worked for a year without pay and by 1894, he took over as the director. This was a position that Binet held until his death, and it enabled him to pursue his studies on mental processes.

Despite Binet's extensive research interests and wide breadth of publications, today he is most widely known for his contributions to intelligence in collaboration with Simon. Wolf postulates that this is the result of his not being affiliated with a major university. Because Binet did not have any formalized graduate study in psychology, he did not hold a professorship with a prestigious institution where students and funds would be sure to perpetuate his work. Additionally, his more progressive theories did not provide the practical utility that his intelligence scale would evoke.

During this time Binet also co-founded the French journal of psychology, L'Année Psychologique, serving as the director and editor-in-chief of the journal that was the first scientific journal in this domain. During this period he worked with Victor Henri, nowadays more famous for his work in physical chemistry and the origins of enzymology, on the effects of intellectual fatigue on metabolism.

=== Later career and the Binet–Simon test ===
In 1899, Binet was asked to be a member of the Free Society for the Psychological Study of the Child. French education changed greatly at the end of the nineteenth century, because of a law that passed which made it mandatory for children ages six to thirteen to attend school. The Society had been established partly to counter pressure from Bourneville to establish boarding schools attached to asylums for children who were not welcome in regular education. There were already such schools for children with clear intellectual impairment and Bourneville wanted to expand them to all children 'unfit' for regular education, also those with less visible intellectual problems.

Two questions became important. First, who should educate children with learning problems: schools or asylums? Second, who was to decide whether a child had a learning problem? Bourneville argued this was the task of psychiatrists, based on medical examination. Binet and the society argued that objective criteria should be used, so that no child would get the label erroneously. The question became "What should be the test given to children thought to possibly have learning disabilities?" Binet made it his problem to establish the differences that separated the normal child from the abnormal, and to measure such differences.

In this endeavor, Binet was helped greatly by Théodore Simon, who was a young psychiatrist working in an asylum for children with intellectual deficiency. Simon not only had access to hundreds of children, but he had begun designing tests that would indicate the degree of disability, under the guidance of his PhD advisor Emmery Blin, who had devised a set of 20 questions to determine what the children referred to him were capable of.

Binet and Simon worked closely to develop more tests and questions that would distinguish between children who did and did not need help in attending regular education. In 1905 they published a preliminary version of their test for measuring intelligence (chased by a committee set up at Bourneville's instigation to decide on this). The full version of the test with age-appropriate standards was published in 1908 and was known as the Binet-Simon scale. In 1911, shortly before Binet's early death, Binet and Simon published a modest revision, which consisted mainly of a regrouping of some tests.

Binet and Simon collected and designed a variety of tasks they thought were representative of typical children's abilities at various ages. This task-selection process was based on their many years of observing children in natural settings and in schools for children with severe deficits and previously published research by Binet and others. They then tested their measurements on children of different ages, for whom they also had an assessment of the school teachers.

The scale consisted of thirty tasks of increasing difficulty. The easier ones could be done by everyone. Some of the simplest test items assessed whether or not a child could follow a beam of light or talk back to the examiner. Slightly harder tasks required children to point to various named body parts, repeat back a series of 2 digits, repeat simple sentences, and define words like house, fork or mama. More difficult test items required children to state the difference between pairs of things, reproduce drawings from memory or to construct sentences from three given words such as "Paris, river and fortune." The hardest test items included asking children to repeat back 7 random digits, find three rhymes for the French word "obéissance" and to answer questions such as "My neighbor has been receiving strange visitors. He has received in turn a doctor, a lawyer, and then a priest. What is taking place?" (Fancher, 1985).

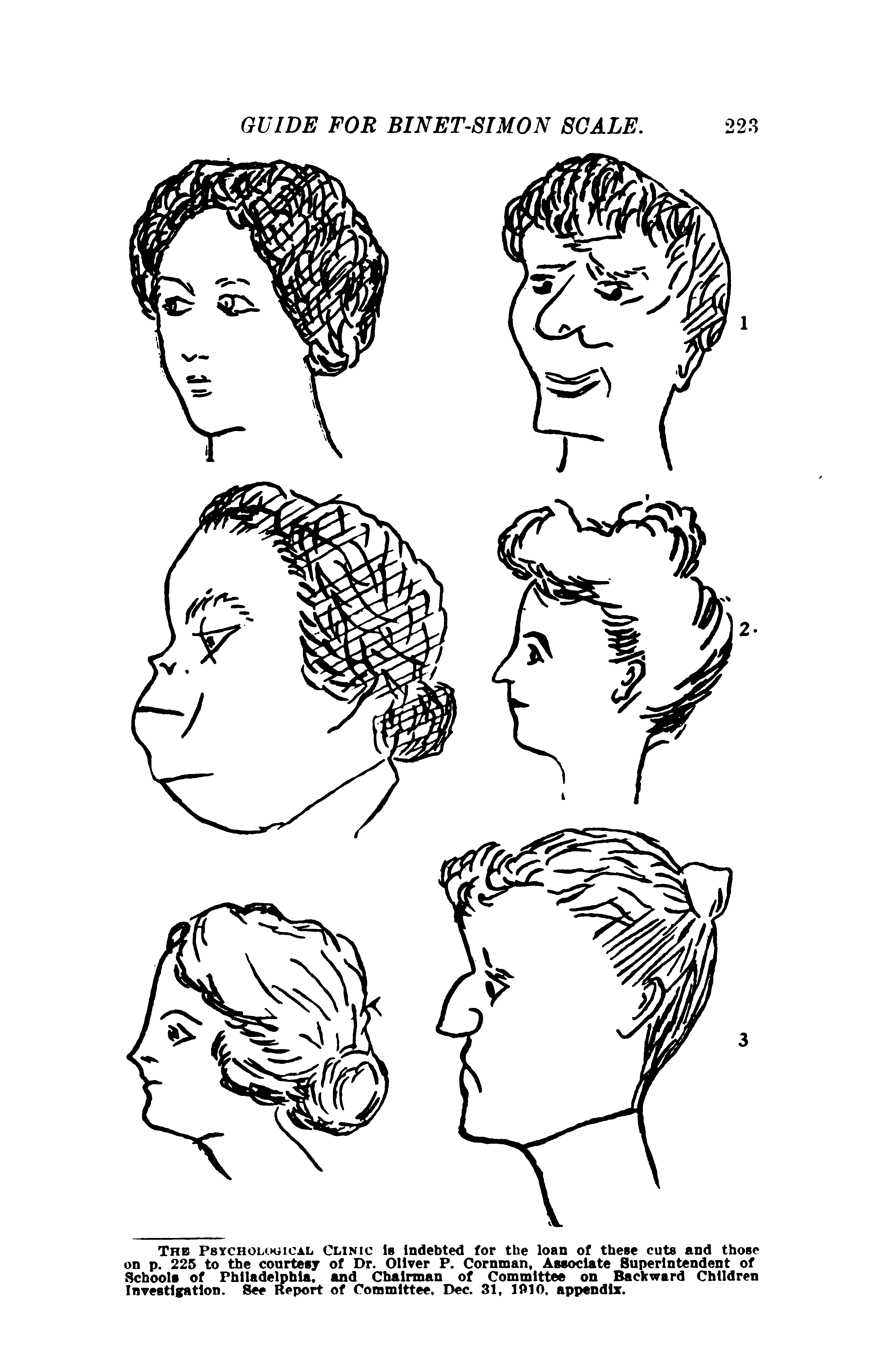
Reproduction of an item from the 1908 Binet-Simon intelligence scale, showing three pairs of pictures, about which the tested child was asked, "Which of these two faces is the prettier?" Reproduced from the article "A Practical Guide for Administering the Binet-Simon Scale for Measuring Intelligence" by J. W. Wallace Wallin in the March 1911 issue of the journal The Psychological Clinic (volume 5 number 1), public domain.

For the practical use of determining educational placement, the score on the Binet-Simon scale would reveal the child's mental age. For example, a 6-year-old child who passed all the tasks usually passed by 6 year-olds—but nothing beyond—would have a mental age that exactly matched his chronological age, 6.0. (Fancher, 1985).

Binet and Simon were forthright about the limitations of their Binet-Simon Intelligence Test. They stressed the remarkable diversity of intelligence and the subsequent need to study it using qualitative, as opposed to quantitative, measures. They also stressed that intellectual development progressed at variable rates and could be influenced by the environment; therefore, intelligence was not based solely on genetics, was malleable rather than fixed, and could only be found in children with comparable backgrounds. Given Binet and Simon's stance that intelligence testing was subject to variability and was not generalizable, it is important to look at the metamorphosis that mental testing took on as it made its way to the U.S.

While Binet and Simon were developing their mental scale, the business, civic, and educational leaders in the U.S. were facing issues of how to accommodate the needs of a diversifying population, while continuing to meet the demands of society. There arose the call to form a society based on meritocracy while continuing to underline the ideals of the upper class. In 1908, H.H. Goddard, a champion of the eugenics movement, found utility in mental testing as a way to evidence the superiority of the white race. After studying abroad, Goddard brought the Binet-Simon Scale to the United States and translated it into English.

Following Goddard in the U.S. mental testing movement was Lewis Terman, who took the Simon-Binet Scale and standardized it using a large American sample. The first test was published in 1916 and called “The Stanford revision of the Binet-Simon Intelligence Scale”. A revision was published in 1937 and now called the Stanford-Binet scale. The name of Simon was all but erased from the record and this has been the reason why Simon's contribution to the development of the test has been overlooked in much of the 20th century and early 21st century.

The Stanford revision of the Binet-Simon Intelligence Scale was no longer used solely for advocating education for all children, as was the original objective. The new objective of intelligence testing was ultimately "curtailing the reproduction of feeble-mindedness and in the elimination of an enormous amount of crime, pauperism, and industrial inefficiency".

Since his death, many people in many ways have honored Binet, but two of these stand out. In 1917, the Free Society for the Psychological Study of the Child, of which Binet became a member in 1899 and which prompted his development of the intelligence tests, changed their name to La Société Alfred Binet, in memory of the renowned psychologist (the name was later changed again into the Binet-Simon Society to credit Simon's contributions). The second honor was not until 1984, when the journal Science 84 picked the Binet-Simon scale as one of twenty of the century's most significant developments or discoveries.

Binet also studied sexual behavior, coining the term erotic fetishism to describe individuals whose sexual interests in nonhuman objects, such as articles of clothing, and linking this to the after-effects of early impressions in an anticipation of Freud.

Between 1904 and 1909, Binet co-wrote several plays for the Grand Guignol theatre with the playwright André de Lorde.

He also studied the abilities of Valentine Dencausse, the most famous chiromancer in Paris in those days.

=== Binet and chess ===
Binet had done a series of experiments to see how well chess players played when blindfolded. He found that only some of the master chess players could play from memory and a few could play multiple games simultaneously without looking at the boards. To remember the positions of the pieces on the boards, some players envisioned exact replicas of specific chess sets, while others envisioned an abstract schema of the game. Binet concluded that extraordinary feats of memory such as blind chess playing could take a variety of mnemonic forms. He recounted his experiments in a book entitled Psychologie des grands calculateurs et joueurs d'échecs (Paris: Hachette, 1894).

== Publications ==
- La psychologie du raisonnement; Recherches expérimentales par l'hypnotisme (Paris, Alcan, 1886; English translation, 1899). Published in English as The psychology of reasoning, based on experimental researches in hypnotism (Chicago, Open court publishing company, 1899).
- Le magnétisme animal (Paris, F. Alcan, 1887). Published in English as Animal Magnetism (New York, D. Appleton and company, 1888)
- Perception intérieure (1887).
- Etudes de psychologie expérimentale (1888).
- Les altérations de la personnalité (Paris: F. Alcan, 1892). Published in English as Alterations of personality (New York : D. Appleton and company, 1896).
- The Psychic Life of Micro-Organisms: A Study in Experimental Psychology (1894)
- Introduction à la psychologie expérimentale (1894; with co-authors).
- On Double Consciousness (1896).
- Binet, A. & Henri, V. La fatigue intellectuelle (Paris, Schleicher frères, 1898).
- La Suggestibilité (Paris: Schleicher, 1900).
- Etude expérimentale de l'intelligence (1903).
- L'âme et le corps (1905). Published in English as The Mind and the Brain (London: Kegan Paul, Trench, Trübner & co. ltd.).
- Les révélations de l'écriture d'après un contrôle scientifique (Paris: Félix Alcan, 1906).
- Binet, A. & Simon, T. Les enfants anormaux (Paris, A. Colin, 1907). Published in English as Mentally defective children (1907).
- Les idées modernes sur les enfants (Paris, E. Flammarion, 1909).
- L'intelligence des imbecile (L'année psychologique, 15, 1–147, 1909). Published in English as The intelligence of the feeble-minded (Baltimore: Williams & Wilkins company, 1916).

Alfred Binet was one of the founding editors of L'année psychologique, a yearly volume comprising original articles and reviews of the progress of psychology still in print.
