= Idiot =

Person of low intelligence

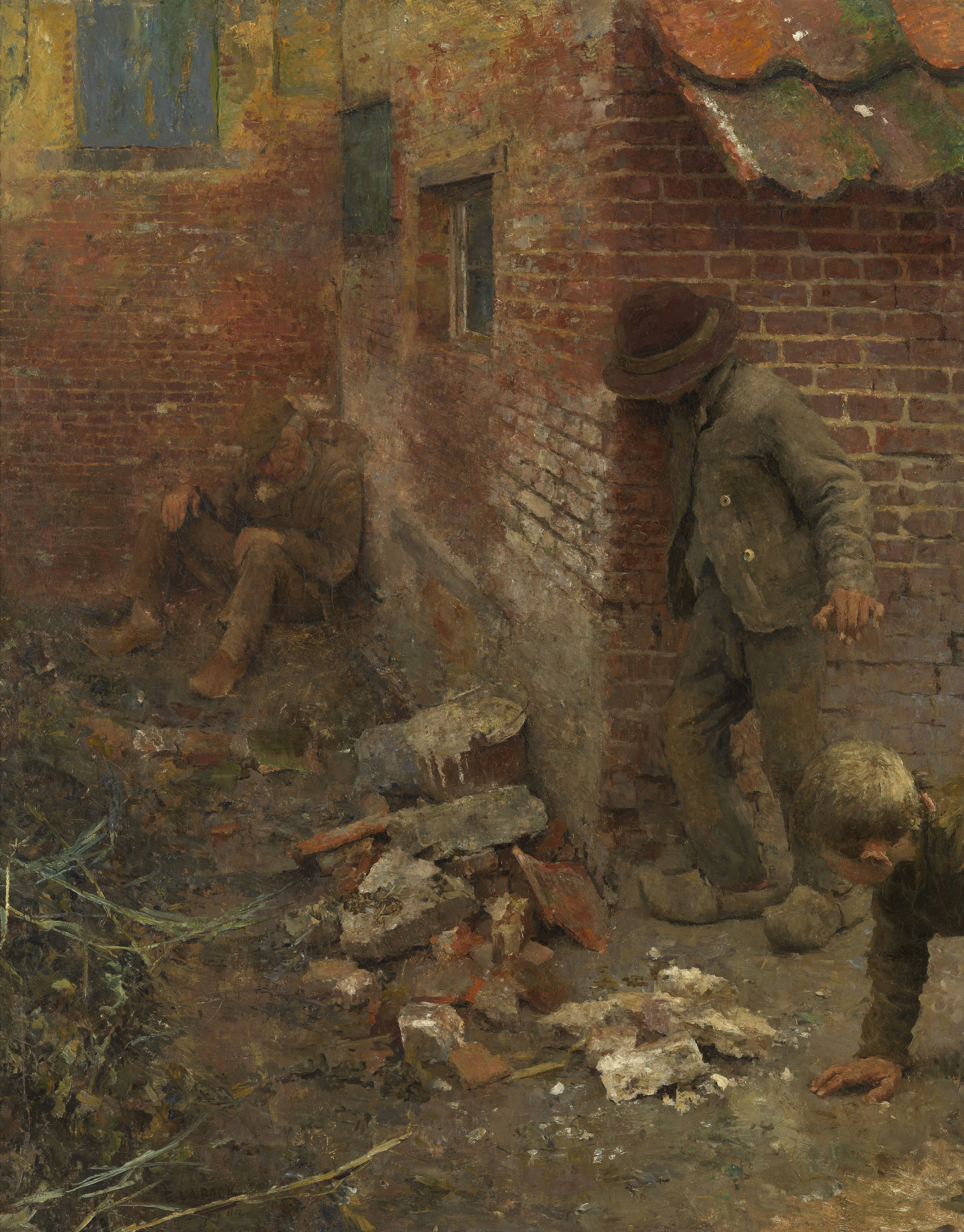
The Idiot by Evert Larock (1892)

An idiot, in modern use, is a stupid or foolish person. Idiot was formerly a technical term in legal and psychiatric contexts for some kinds of profound intellectual disability where the mental age is two years or less, and the person cannot guard themself against common physical dangers. The term was gradually replaced by "profound mental retardation", which has since been replaced by other terms. Along with terms like moron, imbecile, retard and cretin, its use to describe people with mental disabilities is considered archaic and offensive. Moral idiocy is the inability to distinguish between right and wrong.

== Etymology ==
=== Origin ===
Idiot is indirectly borrowed from the Ancient Greek noun ἰδιώτης idiōtēs 'a private person, individual' (as opposed to the state), 'a private citizen' (as opposed to someone with a political office, a ῥήτωρ rhḗtōr), 'a common man', or 'a person lacking professional skill, layman' (as opposed to a craftsman or expert). It is derived from the adjective ἴδιος idios 'personal' (not public, not shared). Later, it came to mean 'unskilled' or 'ignorant'. Latin borrowed idiota in the meaning 'uneducated', 'ignorant', 'common', and in Late Latin came to mean 'crude, illiterate, ignorant'. In French, it kept the meaning of 'illiterate', 'ignorant', and added the meaning 'stupid' in the 13th century. In English, it added the meaning 'mentally deficient' in the 14th century.

=== Spurious notion of Athenian conflation ===
Many political commentators, starting as early as 1856, have interpreted the word "idiot" as reflecting the Ancient Athenians' attitudes to civic participation and private life, combining the ancient meaning of 'private citizen' with the modern meaning 'fool' to conclude that the Greeks used the word to say that it is selfish and foolish not to participate in public life. This interpretation was foreshadowed in 1846, when Julius Hare wrote that the meaning of idiotes as "rude, ignorant person" bore witness to the "Greek notion of the indispensableness of public life".

But this is not how the Greeks used the word. It is certainly true that the Greeks valued civic participation and criticized non-participation. Thucydides quotes Pericles' Funeral Oration as saying: "[we] regard... him who takes no part in these [public] duties not as unambitious but as useless" (Ancient Greek: τόν τε μηδὲν τῶνδε μετέχοντα οὐκ ἀπράγμονα, ἀλλ᾽ ἀχρεῖον νομίζομεν). However, neither he nor any other ancient author uses the word "idiot" to describe non-participants, or in a derogatory sense; its most common use was simply a private citizen or amateur as opposed to a government official, professional, or expert. Indeed, the word idiotes sometimes meant "the ideal Athenian citizen who exercised his political rights".

The derogatory sense came centuries later, and was unrelated to the political meaning.

== Disability and early classification and nomenclature ==
In 19th- and early 20th-century medicine and psychology, an "idiot" was a person with a very profound intellectual disability, being diagnosed with "idiocy". In the early 1900s, Dr. Henry H. Goddard proposed a classification system for intellectual disability based on the Binet-Simon concept of mental age. Individuals with the lowest mental age level (less than three years) were identified as idiots; imbeciles had a mental age of three to seven years, and morons had a mental age of seven to ten years. The term "idiot" was used to refer to people having an IQ below 30. IQ, or intelligence quotient, was originally determined by dividing a person's mental age, as determined by standardized tests, by their actual age. The concept of mental age has fallen into disfavor, though, and IQ is now determined on the basis of statistical distributions.

In the obsolete medical classification (ICD-9, 1977), these people were said to have "profound mental retardation" or "profound mental subnormality" with IQ under 20.

== Regional law ==
=== United States ===
Until 2007, the California Penal Code Section 26 stated that "idiots" were one of six types of people who are not capable of committing crimes. In 2007 the code was amended to read "persons who are mentally incapacitated." In 2008, Iowa voters passed a measure replacing "idiot, or insane person" in the State's constitution with "person adjudged mentally incompetent."

In the constitution of several U.S. states, "idiots" do not have the right to vote:

- Kentucky Section 145
- Mississippi Article 12, Section 241
- Ohio Article V, Section 6

The constitution of the state of Arkansas was amended in the general election of 2008 to, among other things, repeal a provision (Article 3, Section 5) which had until its repeal prohibited "idiots or insane persons" from voting.

== In literature ==
A few authors have used "idiot" characters in novels, plays and poetry. Often these characters are used to highlight or indicate something else (allegory). Examples of such usage are William Faulkner's The Sound and the Fury, Daphne du Maurier's Rebecca and William Wordsworth's The Idiot Boy. Idiot characters in literature are often confused with or subsumed within mad or lunatic characters. The most common intersection between these two categories of mental impairment occurs in the polemic surrounding Edmund from William Shakespeare's King Lear.

In Fyodor Dostoevsky's novel The Idiot the title refers to the central character Prince Myshkin, a man whose innocence, kindness and humility, combined with his occasional epileptic symptoms, cause many in the corrupt, egoistic culture around him to mistakenly assume that he lacks intelligence. In The Antichrist, Nietzsche applies the word "idiot" to Jesus in a comparable fashion, almost certainly in an allusion to Dostoevsky's use of the word: "One has to regret that no Dostoevsky lived in the neighbourhood of this most interesting décadent; I mean someone who could feel the thrilling fascination of such a combination of the sublime, the sick and the childish."
