= Moral idiocy =

Amoral behavior

Moral idiocy is an inability to distinguish between right and wrong, or to understand how moral values apply to one's own life and the lives of others.

The term is sometimes used to describe amoral institutional behavior, with the suggestion that moral idiocy may be an ingrained feature of some social, commercial, and/or political constructs.
