= Théodore Simon =

French psychiatrist (1873–1961)

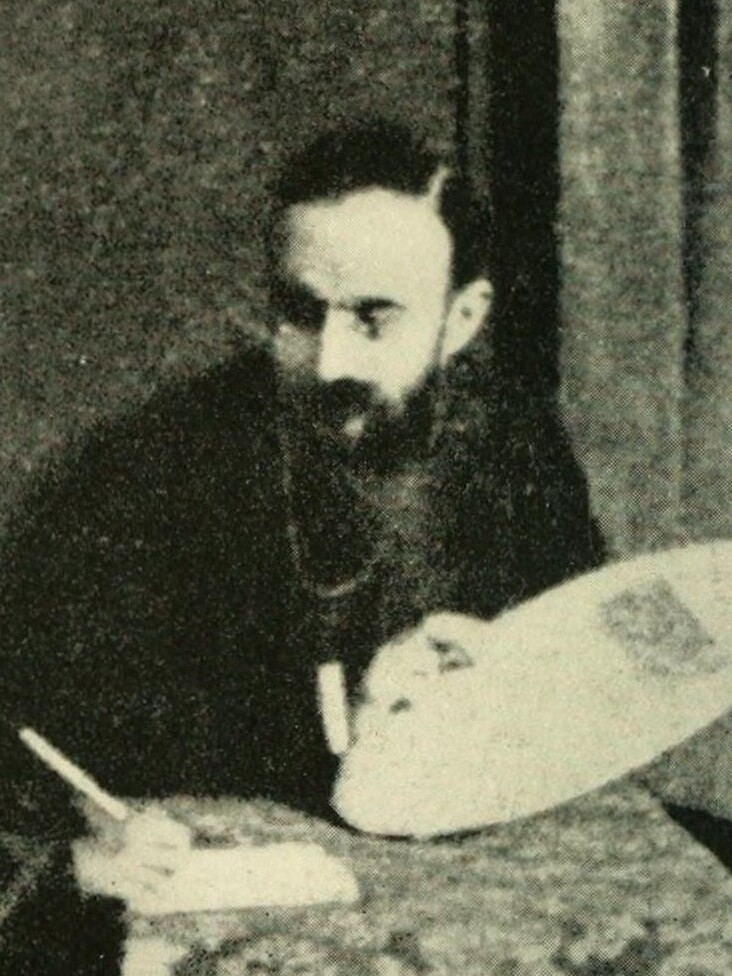
- Simon c. 1905
- Born: 10 July 1873; Dijon, Burgundy, France
- Died: 4 September 1961 (aged 88); Paris, France
- Occupation: Psychiatrist
- Known for: Binet–Simon Intelligence Test

Academic background
- Doctoral advisor: Emmery Blin
- Other advisor: Alfred Binet

Academic work
- Discipline: Psychiatry
- Notable students: Jean Piaget

Théodore Simon (French: [simɔ̃]; 10 July 1873 – 4 September 1961) was a French psychiatrist who worked with Alfred Binet to develop the Binet–Simon Intelligence Test, one of the most widely used scales in the world for measuring intelligence. This scale was revised in 1908 and 1911, and served as a template for the development of newer scales.

Simon worked at various hospitals throughout France, including Sainte-Anne Hospital Center and Dury-les-Amiens. He also worked as the head psychiatrist at Saint-Yon hospital and as a medical director at Perray-Vaucluse. He was also the founder of the first nursing school in psychiatry at the Maison Blanche hospital in Neuilly-sur-Marne, in 1946. The training institute which continues to this day bears his name.

== Biography ==
=== Education and early career ===
Théodore Simon was born on 10 July 1873 in Dijon, France. Simon's father worked as a railroad engineer for PLM. His early life was filled with great loss of family members. After becoming orphaned, Simon lived with his uncle in Sens. Simon's older brother also died at the young age of 23. During much of his early life, he was fascinated by Alfred Binet's work and constantly read his books. Simon was a medical doctor and was interested in questions of both philosophy and psychology. His interest in psychology continually increased, especially as the need for clinical experience in the field decreased.

In 1899, Simon was appointed as a PhD student at the asylum at Perray-Vaucluse where he began his famous work on abnormal children that led to his thesis on the topic in 1900. This drew Binet's attention, who was at the time studying the correlation between physical growth and intellectual development. Binet came to the asylum and continued his work there with Simon.

From 1901-1905, Simon worked in various hospitals, from Sainte-Anne Hospital Center to Dury-les-Amiens. From March 1903 on, Simon worked with Binet in the Free Society for the Psychological Study of Children, which was dedicated to the discussion and the creation of a plan to aid in identifying and improving the education of abnormal children. This sparked Binet and Simon's work on establishing a scale to identify abnormal children. Simon and Binet released a preliminary version of the Binet-Simon Intelligence Scale to the public in 1905 and the full version in 1908. The Binet-Simon Intelligence Scale would become the most widely used device for measuring a person's intelligence. The Binet-Simon Intelligence Scale premiered in L'Année psychologique a journal founded by Binet in 1895.

=== Late career ===
Simon was critical of the immoderate and improper use of the Binet-Simon Intelligence Scale by other psychologists and professionals due to his belief that the scale was being over-used, which may have been inappropriate, preventing psychologists from achieving Binet's ultimate goal of understanding human beings, their nature, and their development. The Binet-Simon Intelligence Scale was revised in 1911, shortly before Binet's death. Simon kept the scale the same after Binet's death as a sign of respect for one of history's greatest psychologists and Simon's true idol.

After 1905 until 1920, Simon worked as the head psychiatrist at Saint-Yon hospital in Essonne department in Île-de-France (northern France). In 1920, he returned as medical director at Perray-Vaucluse until 1930. From there, he moved to act as medical director until late 1936, when he retired. Starting in 1912, Simon was also a long-time president and editor for Bulletin of Société Alfred Binet. In 1946 Simon established the first specialized nursing school. Originally the Ecole des Bleues, and later renamed L'Ecole d'Infirmières de Maison-Blanche, it is now the Institut de Formation Interhospitalier Theodore Simon. He served as the technical director for 11 years (1946–1957).

Simon died in 1961.

== Publications ==
- Binet, A., & Simon, Th. (1905a). New methods for diagnosing the idiot, the imbecile, and the moron. In Sante de Sanctis (Ed.), Atti del V congresso internazionale di psicologia tenuto in Roma dal 26 al 30 aprile 1905 sotto la presidenza del Prof Giuseppe Sergi (pp. 507–510). Rome, Italy: Forzani.
- Binet, A.; Simon, Th. (1905b). "New methods for the diagnosis of the intellectual level of subnormals". L'Année Psychologique. 11: 191–244. doi:10.3406/psy.1904.3675.
- Binet, A.; Simon, Th. (1908). "The development of intelligence in children". L'Année Psychologique. 14: 1–94. doi:10.3406/psy.1907.3737.
- Binet, A.; Simon, Th (1911). "The measure of the development of the intelligence in young children". Bulletin de la Société Libre pour l'Étude de l'Enfant. 11: 187–256.
- Binet, A.; Simon, Th.; Vaney, V. (1906). "The laboratory of Grange-aux-belles street". Bulletin de la Société libre pour l'Étude de l'Enfant. 34: 10–24.
