= List of age-related terms with negative connotations =

The following is a list of terms used in relation to age with negative connotations. Many age-negative terms intersect with ableism, or are derogatory toward people with neurodegenerative diseases such as Alzheimer's disease and dementia. Age-negative terms are used about young people as well as older people. A large number of these terms are United States slang. Style guides such as the "Age Writing Guide" by the University of Bristol have been implemented in some institutions to attempt to eliminate the use of ageist terms in academic writing.

Some of these terms may not be pejorative depending on context.

== Terms ==
=== A ===
- Adorable: Not necessarily negative, a term that, when specifically applied to an older person or a senior citizen, can be considered patronizing and mocking in nature, particularly if the term is being used to refer to mental disabilities or dependency.
- Adult diaper: A type of disposable diaper or underpants for adults who struggle with urinary or fecal incontinence or other medical issues that affect bladder and bowel control; it is recommended by groups such as AgingCare that nurses and other professional care staff not use the term "diaper" due to its connotation with infants and children; preferred terms are adult descriptors such as "briefs", "panties", or the product's brand name, for example Depends.
- Alligator bait, 'gator bait: A racist slur used to describe black children and young people, comparing their worth to bait used to catch alligators; the term 'gator bait was banned from a common cheer in Florida due to its offensive meaning, and is generally no longer used.
- Ancient: An insulting term to refer to an older person or senior citizen.

=== B ===
- Baba Yaga: A Slavic mythological figure and slang term referring to an unsightly old woman, who frightens or upsets children.
- Baby: Term often used to tease others for being childish or too young, or for behaving in an immature way.
- Bag lady: A homeless old woman or vagrant.
- Barely legal: A term used to market pornography featuring young people who are "barely legal" (only just reached legal age of majority or the age of consent, or both). The term fetishizes young people sexually.
- Bed blocker: A derogatory term used to describe older people taking up hospital beds in a healthcare system.
- Beldame: An outdated term referring to an old woman, especially an ugly one.
- Biddy: An annoying, gossipy or interfering old lady.
- Blue-hair: Derogatory term referring to older women who color their hair a distinctive silvery-blue.
- Boomer: A postwar era-born person from the "Baby Boom", or a "baby boomer"; this term can also be used in a neutral context.
- Boomer remover: A slang term used to describe the COVID-19 pandemic; the term drew criticism for trivializing and mocking the high death rates of aging people due to the pandemic.
- Boomerang kid: A term for an adult who ceases to live independently from their parents and moves back home, typically derogatory.
- Brat: A term used to describe a badly-behaved or spoiled child.
- Burden: A term (also ableist) of contempt or disdain used to describe old and infirm or disabled people who either don't contribute to society or who contribute in a limited way; this lack of contribution may be imposed or facilitated by social stigma and other factors.

=== C ===
- Christmas cake: A Japanese term referring to a woman who is unmarried past the age of 25, likening them to a Christmas cake that is unsold after the 25th (of December) and no longer desirable.
- Codger: An old-fashioned or eccentric old man.
- Coot: A crazy and foolish old man; senile man.
- Cougar: An American slang term referring to older women who have romantic or sexual relations with younger men, although the term can also have a positive connotation depending on the situation or circumstance.
- Crone: An ugly or witch-like old woman.
- Curmudgeon: An ill-tempered, grumpy or surly old man (although the term is most often applied to old men, it can be used more broadly: for example, in the 2008 film Marley & Me, John Grogan, a forty-year-old man, is called a curmudgeon for complaining about the prevalence of aesthetically ugly high-rise condos popping up in his city).

=== D ===
- Dinosaur: Slang term used to describe an out-of-touch older person, a clueless person or an ignorant older man.
- Dirty old man: An old pervert, specifically referring to older men who make unwanted sexual advances or remarks, or who often engage in sex-related activities. The term can suggest that it is inappropriate and unnatural for older men to be sexually active. The term may also have misandrist connotations in the West.
- Dotard: A weak older person with limited mental faculties, or a mentally disabled older person.
- Dried up: Slang for a sexually-inactive older person, often used to refer to post-menopausal women.

=== E ===
- Empty nesters: Older people with children who have moved out of the family residence; people who are downsizing their living quarters.

=== F ===
- Failure to launch: A term referring to a young adult who has not yet met the societal standards of their culture for being a typical adult, such as going to university, moving to their own residence or getting a job.
- Fogey: An old man who has old-fashioned or conservative interests and tastes.
- Fuddy-duddy: A silly or foolish old man.

=== G ===
- Geezer: A significantly aged old man. In the UK, it is a slang term used most often to refer simply to a "man" or "guy".
- Geriatric: Offensive slang only when used in a non-medical context.
- Gerry: (Not to be confused with the pejorative ethnic term towards German people; "gerry" in this context is short for "geriatric").
- Gold-digger: A younger person, typically a woman, who seduces and then gets money, affection and possessions from an older person; the term can also have criminal implications.
- Golden Girls: A group of older women who are friends; originates from the term "golden years", and from the 1980s sitcom The Golden Girls.
- Guang Gun: A derogatory Chinese slang term loosely translating to "bare branches" or "bare sticks", used to describe unmarried men who have no legitimate children and therefore don't carry on the family tree or family name; the male equivalent of "spinster" or "Sheng nu".

=== H ===
- Harold and Maude: A couple consisting of two partners between whom there is a large age gap; slang term originates from the 1971 comedy feature film Harold and Maude.
- Has-been: An older person out-of-touch with modern trends, or outmoded and no longer wanted/needed by their place of employment or society. It is used also towards a living "washed-up" or no longer relevant or influential personality, like a former celebrity.
- Having a "senior moment": A temporary mental lapse jokingly attributed to senility or old age.
- Hipster: A term (often pejorative) referring to young people who are pretentious and heavily focused on keeping up with certain high-end fashion and lifestyle choices.

=== J ===
- Jailbait: A slang term used to identify a young girl or boy who is under the age of consent as a sexual object.

=== K ===
- Kidult: An adult with an interest in childish things and things from childhood that they are nostalgic for; for example, a grown man with no children who plays with My Little Pony figurines or sleeps with plush toys. The term is used positively or neutrally in animation for kid-looking adult characters like Mickey Mouse, SpongeBob, Chip & Dale and Cuphead & Mugman.

A 1960s Italian edition of Lolita by Vladimir Nabokov, depicting a young girl eating a lollipop; the girl is portrayed as sexually mature and promiscuous. In the book of the same name, she is a minor exploited by the main character, who is an adult man.

=== L ===
- Little old lady: A harmless and helpless older woman; innocent and pitiful older woman.
- Lolita: A term for a sexualized minor child, typically a girl; the term has pedophilic connotations and is often used to fetishize or exploit vulnerable preteen girls. "Lolita" is a term of endearment from the book Lolita by Vladimir Nabokov.

=== M ===
- Maggot(s) in the rice: A derogatory term in contemporary Chinese culture referring to baby girls; the term is typically associated with 20th-century China's authoritarian "One Child Policy", which limited birth of children per family and also favoured male children. China's government has since implemented efforts to change this perception.
- Mama-san: A term (often considered pejorative, outdated) referring to an older woman from East Asia in an authority position.
- Man-child or Man-baby: A grown adult man who lives like a child or teenager typically would.
- Mexican air bag: A child sitting in the lap of a person driving a vehicle (as opposed to being in a car seat)
- MILF: An acronym slang term meaning "mother I'd like to fuck"; considered sexist and ageist by some and positive or neutral by others.
- Mrs. Robinson: Refers to a character in the 1967 feature film "The Graduate"; slang term referring to an older woman pursuing someone younger than herself, typically an adolescent male.

=== O ===
- Okay, boomer: Pejorative term and internet meme that is used as a retort to opinions that are associated with the Baby boomer generation — some consider the term ageist.
- Old bag / Old hag: An older, unappealing and ugly woman.
- Old bat: A senile older woman.
- Old cow: A rude term for an older woman, especially one who is overweight or obese and homely.
- Old fart: A boring and old-fashioned silly person.
- Old maid: An older never married lady.
- Olderly: Newfoundland slang term for "elderly"; can be offensive or neutral depending on the context.
- Oldster: An offensive term that gained strong pejorative status during the COVID-19 pandemic; used to describe senior citizens affected by the pandemic.
- Old white man/men: A derogatory term for older white men usually in reference to that demographic's perceived disproportionate political power and higher rate of conservative belief.
- Out to pasture: Euphemism for retirement, likening retirement to putting a working livestock animal, such as a horse or ox, out to pasture for grazing.

=== P ===
- Pensioner: An older person living on an old-age pension; sometimes used as an insult to refer to aging people draining the welfare system.
- Peter Pan: A term describing a grown adult, typically a man, who behaves like a child or teenager and refuses, either actively or passively, to act their true age. It is also used as a positive way, even as a compliment, depending on the context and circumstance.
- Pops: A condescending (depending on context) term for an older, out-of-touch man.
- Punk: A misbehaved young person, not to be confused with punk subculture.

=== S ===
- Senile: Senility; broad term (with some legitimate medical usage) referring to older people with declining mental capabilities. The term is used also against people with still good mental capabilities, merely due to their age.
- Sheng nu: A derogatory Chinese slang term loosely translating to "leftover women", used to describe unmarried older women.
- Silver fox: A sexually-attractive or promiscuous older person.
- Spinster: A woman who, in her own culture, is single beyond the age at which most people get married.
- Squeaker: A boy whose voice has not yet deepened due to puberty. Mostly used in online gaming, where the kid's face cannot be seen, but he can be heard "squeaking" into the voice chat.

=== W ===
- Whippersnapper: A young person who thinks they know more than they do, typically a teenager or young adult; a smartass.
- Witch: An older woman who is cranky, physically unattractive, and bitter.
- Wrinkle room: A term in gay culture referring to bars where old men congregate.
- Wrinkled old prune: A derogatory term referring to old people by way of their wrinkled skin and consumption of fiber, comparing them to dehydrated plums.

=== Y ===
- Young fogey: A British slang term referring to conservatively dressed, young preppy men.
- Yuppie: An urban professional, typically of the 1980s era, a sellout; developed a pejorative connotation from the association with consumerism, gentrification and indifference towards socio-economic issues.
- Yuppie flu: A pejorative term for chronic fatigue syndrome, originating in the 1980s as a stereotype of people with CFS as frustrated and spoiled young yuppies.

=== Z ===
- Zoomer: A blend word of "Generation Z" and "boomer"; refers to people born in the late 1990s or early 2000. Like "boomer", the term can also be used neutrally.

== See also ==
- Ableism
- Adultism
- Age discrimination in the United States
- Age segregation
- Ageism
- Double standard of aging
- Elder abuse
- List of disability-related terms with negative connotations
