= Guiri =

Spanish colloquialism for foreigners

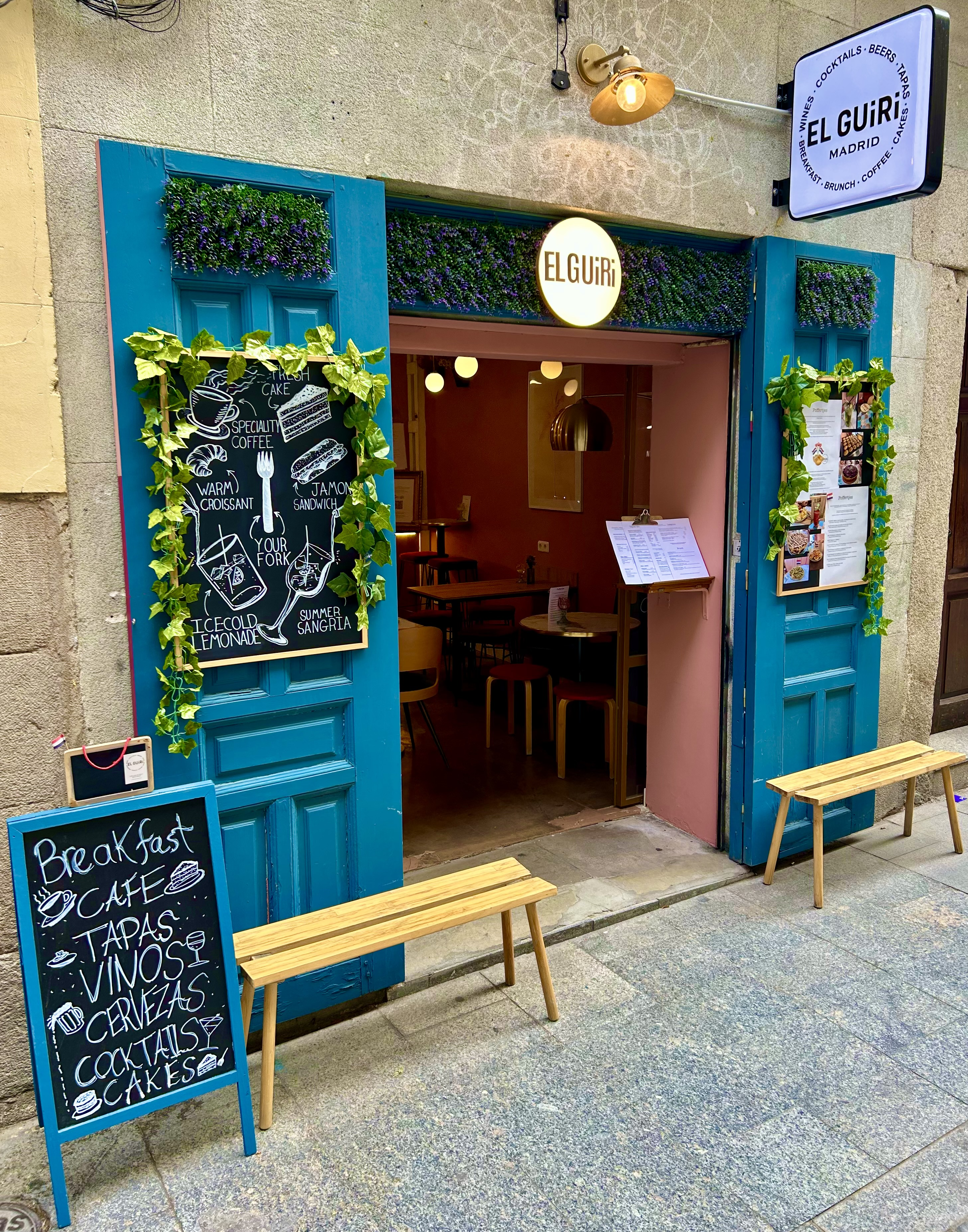
Cafe in Madrid with the name EL GUiRi

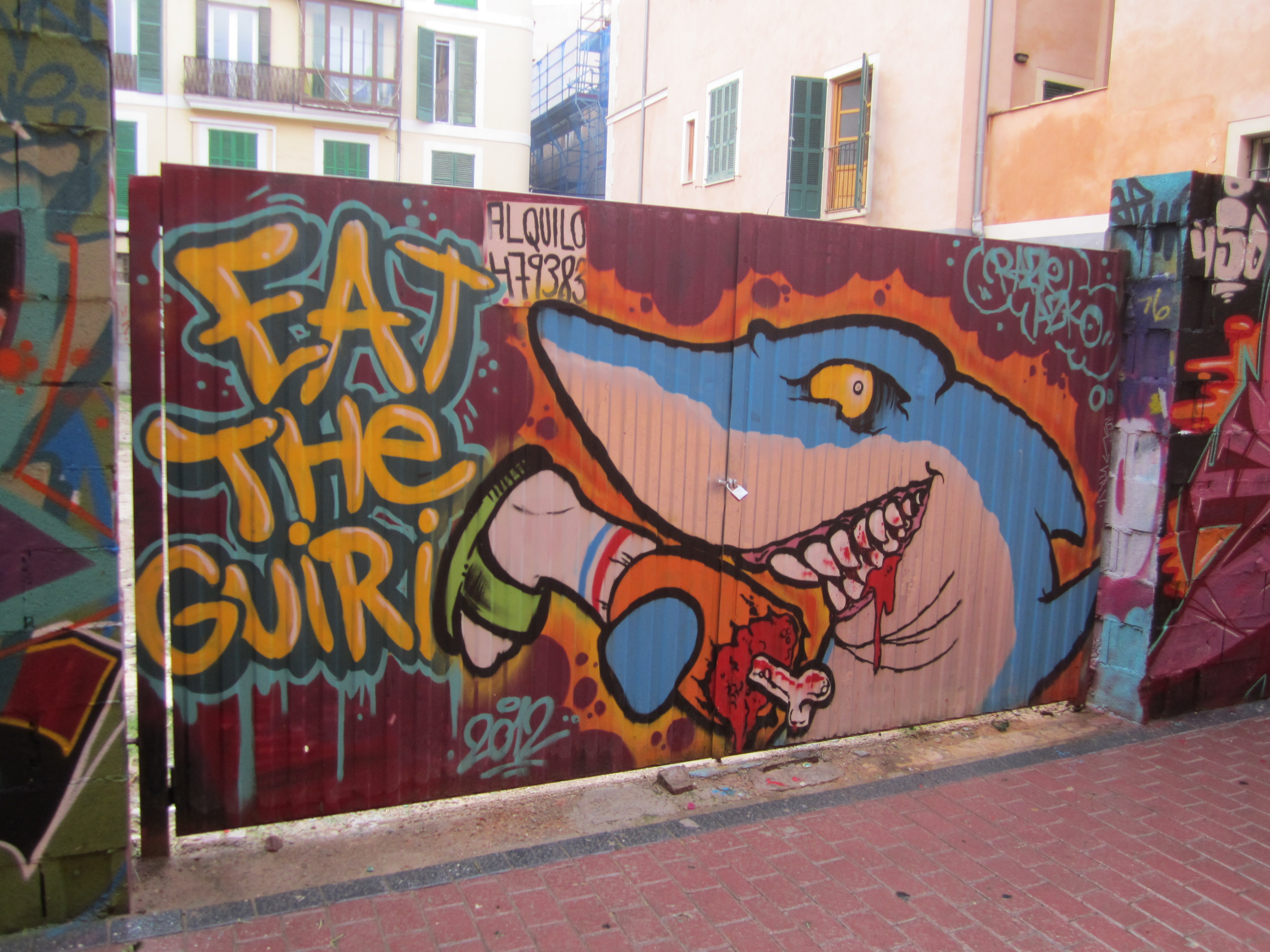
Graffiti in Palma, Mallorca. "Eat the Guiri"

Guiri (pronounced [ˈɡiɾi]) is a colloquial Spanish word often used in Spain to refer to uncouth foreign tourists, usually those with Northern European looks. However, it can also be applied to people from other foreign countries, particularly to white individuals. Although somewhat pejorative, it is not considered a slur by Spanish-speakers if used as a light-hearted tease.

== Origins ==
According to the Diccionario de la lengua española of the Real Academia, the word can be traced back to 19th century Carlist Wars in the form "guiristino", the pronunciation of Basque-speaking Carlist forces of the name of their enemies, the Cristinos (after regent Queen Maria Christina). It first entered that dictionary in the 15th edition in 1925. When a "guiri" would be the term used by the opposing political parties of the time, later to be exclusively used for the Guardia Civil and Policía Armada (Armed Police) under the Francoist régime.

There is another theory by Juan Goytisolo that guiri is a neologism from Caló, which itself derives from the Moroccan and Algerian Arabic gaouri, a word with a similar meaning applying to Europeans, which in turn stems from Ottoman Turkish gâvur.

== See also ==
- Gringo
- List of common nouns derived from ethnic group names
- List of ethnic slurs
- List of ethnic slurs and epithets by ethnicity
- List of terms for ethnic exogroups
- Lists of pejorative terms for people
- Xenophobia
