= Goy =

Word meaning 'non-Jew'

Goy (pl. goyim or goys) is a term for a gentile, a non-Jew, sometimes in a pejorative sense. The word, of Hebrew origin, was adopted into English from Yiddish. It carries a similar meaning in Modern Hebrew.

The Biblical Hebrew word goy has been commonly translated into English as 'nation', meaning a group of persons of the same ethnic family who speak the same language (rather than the more common modern meaning of a political unit). In the Bible, goy is used to describe both the Nation of Israel and other nations.

The meaning of the word goy in Hebrew evolved to mean "non-Jew" in the Hellenistic (300 BCE to 30 BCE) and Roman periods, as both Rabbinical texts and then Christian theology placed increasing emphasis on a binary division between Jews and non-Jews.

As a word principally used by Jews to describe non-Jews, it is a term for the ethnic out-group. In modern usage in English, the extent to which goy is derogatory is a point of discussion in the Jewish community.

The word goy is sometimes used by white supremacists and antisemites to refer to themselves when signaling a belief in antisemitic tropes.

== Hebrew Bible ==
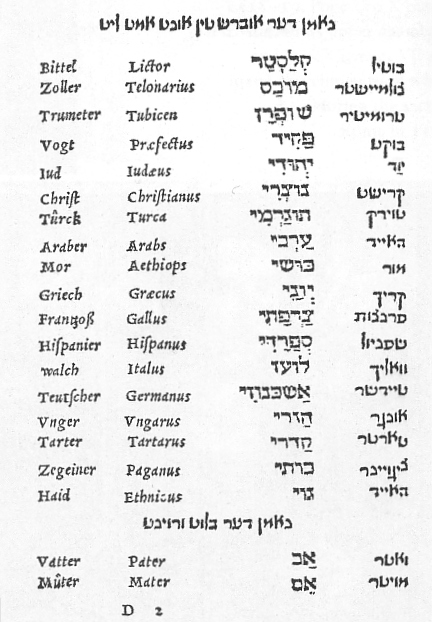
A page from Elia Levita's Yiddish–Hebrew–Latin–German dictionary (16th century) including the word goy (גוי), translated to Latin as ethnicus, meaning heathen or pagan.

The word goy means 'nation' in Biblical Hebrew. In the Torah, goy and its variants appear 560 times in reference to both the Israelites and the non-Israelite nations.

The first recorded usage of goyim occurs in Genesis 10:5 and applies to non-Israelite nations. The first mention of goy in relation to the Israelites comes in Genesis 12:2, when God promises Abraham that his descendants will form a goy gadol ("great nation").

There are two exceptions where a "Kingdom of Goyim" is mentioned. One is in Genesis 14:1, where it states that the "King of Goyim" was Tidal. Bible commentaries suggest that the term may refer to Gutium. The other is in Joshua 12:23, where a "King of Goyim in Gilgal" is included in the list of kings slain by Joshua. In all other cases the meaning of goyim is 'nations.'

In Exodus 19:6, the Israelites are referred to as a goy kadosh, a 'holy nation'. One of the more poetic descriptions of the chosen people in the Hebrew Bible, and popular among Jewish scholars is goy ehad b'aretz, or 'a unique nation upon the earth' (2 Samuel 7:23 and 1 Chronicles 17:21)

=== Translations of goy in English-language Christian Bibles ===
In English language Christian bibles, nation has been used as the principal translation for goy in the Hebrew Bible, from the earliest English language bibles such as the 1530 Tyndale Bible and the 1611 King James Version.

The King James Version of the Bible translates the word goy/goyim as nation 374 times, heathen 143 times, Gentile 30 times (see Evolution of the Term below) and people 11 times. The New American Standard Bible translation uses the following words: "every nation" (2 times) Gentiles (1) Goiim (1), Harosheth-hagoyim* (3), herds (1), nation (120), nations (425), people (4).

== Evolution of the term ==
While the books of the Hebrew Bible often use goy to describe the Israelites, the later Jewish writings of the Hellenistic Period (from approximately 300 BCE to 30 BCE) tended to apply the term to other nations.

Goy acquired the meaning of someone who is not Jewish in the first and second century CE. Before that time, academics Adi Ophir and Ishay Rosen-Zvi have argued, no crystallized dichotomy between Jew and non-Jew existed in Judaism. Ophir and Rosen-Zvi state that the early Jewish convert to Christianity, Paul, was key in developing the concept of goy to mean non-Jew:

This brilliant Hellenist Jew [Paul] considered himself the apostle of the Christian gospel "to the gentiles," and precisely because of this he needed to define that category more thoroughly and carefully than his predecessors. Paul made the conception that "goyim" are not "peoples," but rather a general category of human beings, into a central element of his thought [...] In the centuries that followed, both the Church and the Jewish sages evoked Paul's binary dichotomy.

— Haaretz journalist Tomer Persico discussing views of Ophir and Rosen-Zvi

The Latin words gentes/gentilis – which also referred to peoples or nations – began to be used to describe non-Jews in parallel with the evolution of the word goy in Hebrew. Based on the Latin model, the English word "gentile" came to mean non-Jew from the time of the first English-language Bible translations in the 1500s (see Gentile).

The twelfth century Jewish scholar Maimonides defines goy in his Mishneh Torah as a worshipper of idolatry, as he explains, "Whenever we refer to a gentile [goy] without any further description, we mean one who worships false deities". Maimonides saw Christians as idolators (because of concepts like the Trinity) but not Muslims who he saw as more strictly monotheistic.

== As a derogatory term ==
Goy can be used in a derogatory manner. The Yiddish lexicographer Leo Rosten in The New Joys of Yiddish defines goy as someone who is non-Jewish or someone who is dull, insensitive, or heartless. Goy also occurs in many pejorative Yiddish expressions, including:

- Dos ken nor a goy (דאָס קען נאָר אַ גױ) – Something only a goy would do or is capable of doing.
- A goy blabt a goy (אַ גױ בלאַבט אַ גױ) – "A goy stays a goy"
- Goyisher kop (גױישער קאָפּ) – "Gentile head," someone who doesn't think ahead, an idiot.
- Goyishe naches (גױישע נחת) – Pleasures or pursuits only a gentile would enjoy.
- A goy! (!אַ גױ) – Exclamation of exasperation used "when endurance is exhausted, kindliness depleted, the effort to understand useless".

Several authors have opined on whether the word is derogatory. Dan Friedman, executive director of The Forward, writes in "What 'Goy' Means, And Why I Keep Using It" that it can be used as an insult but that the word is not offensive. He compares it to the word "foreigners" which Americans can use dismissively but which isn't a derogatory word. Similarly, Jews for Racial and Economic Justice (JFREJ) has stated that goy is "Not an insult, just kinda sounds like it." The term Shabbos goy, which refers to a non-Jew who performs certain tasks forbidden to Jews on Shabbat, is an example of common usage that, while drawing attention to the binary division of all people into Jews and non-Jews, is not pejorative, and in fact highlights historical cooperation between observant Jews and their friends, neighbors, and colleagues.

Rebecca Einstein Schorr argues that the word has an established pejorative overtone. She refers to the observation "the goyishe groomsmen were all drunk and bawdy; of course, you'd never see that at a Jewish wedding" and "goyishe kop" where the word is used in a pejorative sense. She admits that the word can have non-pejorative uses, such as "goyishe restaurant" – one that doesn't serve kosher foods – but contends that the word is "neutral, at best, and extremely offensive, at worst". She advocates that the Jewish community stop using the word goy. Andrew Silow Carroll writes:

But the word "goy" has too much historical and linguistic baggage to be used as casually as "non-Jew" or "gentile." It starts with the obvious slurs – like "goyishe kopf," or gentile brains, which suggests (generously) a dullard, or "shikker iz a goy," a gentile is a drunkard. "Goyishe naches" describes the kinds of things that a Jew mockingly presumes only a gentile would enjoy, like hunting, sailing and eating white bread.

Mira Fox, a journalist at The Forward, wrote:

Tone and context is everything, just like with any term. "Jew" can be an insult, too, but it obviously is simply a descriptor as well; I call myself a Jew, because I am religiously and ethnically Jewish. If someone spat "Jew" at me on the street, however, I'd be insulted.

She further writes:

Thats really the simple rule for when goy is a slur, or when it's antisemitic: If the person using it is a bigot, it's bigoted. Otherwise, it’s just a word.

Writer Mike Rothschild linked Jeffrey Epstein's derogatory usage of the word in quotations like "This is the way the jew make money.. and made a fortune in the past ten years„ selling short the shippping[sic] futures„ let the goyim deal in the real world" with a rise in antisemitic conspiracy theories online in the wake of the release of the Epstein files.

Due to this, writer Rebecca Einstein Schorr, wrote:

There are some non-Jews who think that all of us use this word to describe them. Sometimes they believe that it's a quaint honorific. Others, however, are under the impression that all Jews regard them negatively, and this plays out in an unexpected way. Disturbingly, the white supremacists have co-opted it to refer to themselves in a shocking example of linguistic appropriation. By incorporating it, and other Yiddish terms, into their nationalist lingo, they perpetuate the anti-Semitic myth that we are a cabal with our own secret language and agenda.

In this context, she argues against the usage of the term amongst the Jewish community, citing religious works:

Ultimately, however, it is our word. One with a historical use that is neutral, at best, and extremely offensive, at worst. And if we are to be allies with our non-Jewish friends, neighbors, and family members, it is time to eliminate it and other racially and culturally derogatory words from our parlance. Not because, as some have suggested, we want to be "politically-correct," but because it is how we maintain God's demand that we be goy kadosh – a holy nation.

== In antisemitism ==
According to the Southern Poverty Law Center, white supremacists have ironically used the term goy in reference to themselves as a signal of their belief in conspiracy theories about Jews. For example, a Hungarian antisemitic motorcycle association refers to themselves as the Goyim riders, and in 2020, Kyle Chapman tried to rename the far-right group the Proud Boys to the Proud Goys.

In a similar vein, the far-right American Traditionalist Worker Party, in 2017, created the crowdfunding platform called GoyFundMe, a wordplay on the popular crowdfunding platform GoFundMe.

The Goyim Defense League (GDL) and its website, GoyimTV, are another example.

Europol's 2021 report on Terrorism Situations and Trends discusses the German Goyim Partei Deutschland ('Goyim Party Germany'), "a right-wing extremist organisation" founded in 2016 which "used its website to publish antisemitic and racist texts, pictures and videos."

The term is also featured in the far-right catchphrase or meme "The Goyim Know, Shut It Down" associated with Neo-Nazis on online forums like the 4chan and 8chan. In this context, the "speaker" assumes the role of a "panicking Jew" who reacts to an event that would reveal Jewish "manipulations" or Jewish "deceitfulness".

In response to Tyler Oliveira's YouTube video where he uses "goy" to refer to non-Jews as victims of a "Jewish invasion", Mira Fox wrote:

It's silly to pretend Oliveira's use of goy isn't obviously a loaded one; goy may not inherently be an insult, but when it's deployed with a conspiratorial wink to antisemites, it's antisemitic.

According to the Anti-Defamation League, the antisemitic meme first appeared on 4chan in 2013. Einstein Schorr called the meme an instance of "linguistic appropriation" whereby Neo-Nazis cynically incorporated "pseudo-Yiddish phrases" into their vocabulary to ridicule Jews. Schorr describes that as a way to propagate the "anti-Semitic myth that we are a cabal with our own secret language and agenda".

The Anti-Defamation League further deciphers the catchphrase,

The language is typically used in references to antisemitic conspiracy theories depicting Jews as malevolent puppet-masters, manipulating the media, banks, and even entire governments to the benefit of themselves but to the detriment of other peoples.

== See also ==
- Gentile
- Goyslop
- Shabbos goy
- Gadjo, a non-Romani person
- Ger toshav
- Giaour
- Kafir
