= List of terms for ethnic out-groups =

An ethnic out-group (also sometimes "outgroup" without hyphen) is a group of people which does not belong to a particular ethnic group, religion or nationality.

== A ==
Ajam
(Arabic; عجم) Literally: mumbler, a person who cannot speak proper Arabic. A traditional term for non-Arabs (literally as those who cannot speak, or cannot be understood), often specifically applied to Persians. Derogatory implications depend on context.
Ajnabi
(Arabic; اجنبی) Literally: Stranger, foreigner or alien. Traditionally used for westerners.
Allochtoon
A Dutch term (from the Greek ἄλλος-allos (other) and χθων (country) that literally means "originating from another country". Refers to both immigrants and their descendants. Officially refers to any person with at least one immigrant parent. Not usually considered offensive.
Anērān also Anirani
Pre-Islamic Persian term referring to people who are both non-Iranians and non-Zoroastrians, most used in Middle Persian and Early Modern Persian texts.
Ang mo
A Hokkien term (Min Nan Chinese: 红毛, lit. 'red hair') referring to white people.
Ausländer
Ausländer is a German word meaning foreigner or alien. Literally "outlander".

== B ==
Barbarian
Although the modern usage of the word may carry a different meaning, historically this term was used to denote non-Greek-speaking people and later anyone not belonging to Greek or Roman civilization.

Bilagáana
(Bilagáana) is the Navajo word for white people or people of European descent.

Bule
Bule is an Indonesian word commonly used to refer to foreigners, and more specifically Westerners and Europeans.

== E ==
Englischer
A non-derogatory Pennsylvanian Dutch word used by the Amish to refer to a non-Amish person.
English
A non-derogatory English Amish term to refer to the non-Amish, derived from the Pennsylvanian Dutch Englisch/Englischer (see above). Also used by Doukhobors in Canada to refer to non-Russian speakers.

== F ==
Farang
(Thai; ฝรั่ง) A generic term for foreigner used to refer to those of European ancestry and can be used to refer to plants or animals that are foreign in origin as an adjective. The word Farang derives - via tenth century Arabic and then Persian - from Frank, referring to the Germanic people that gave their name to modern France.
Farangi
(Persian; فرنگی) A Persian term for foreigner. The word derives from Franks. May have derogatory connotations.

== G ==
Gaijin
(Japanese; 外人) Literally 'out person', usually used in context to refer someone who is ethnically not Japanese. Considered politically incorrect and often derogatory by those it refers to. Because Japanese is a highly contextual language, it is possible to use the word "Gaijin" without derogatory intent; however, "Gaikokujin" (外国人) literally "out country person", is highly preferred to remain politically correct and avoid misunderstanding.
Gadjo
(Romany) A Romany term meaning "house dweller," used to refer to a non-Roma.
Galla
(Abyssinian) A term used by Abyssinian Christians to refer to non-Christian, mainly non-Semitic Cushitic Pagans, and Muslims. It was employed in official documents and communications until the fall of the Solomonic Dynasty in 1974.
The use of the term mainly pointed to the Oromo due to their numerical superiority over other groups that were collectively referred to by this term during the period of the Ethiopian monarchy.
Gentile
(English) Term used in English principally to mean "non-Jew". Gentile derives from Latin 'Gentes/Gentilis' a word which originally meant "people" or "tribe" but which evolved in the early Christian era to refer to a non-Jew. In Judaism the word 'Goy' (see below) followed the same journey over the same period: also evolving from meaning "nation" or "tribe" to mean non-Jew. Some Christian groups that claim Israelite heritage, notably Mormons, have traditionally used the term gentile to describe outsiders, but such usage has declined among Mormons.
Giaour
(Turkish; gâvur) Also spelled Ghiaour or Gavur, a generic term for a non-Muslim or non-Turk, often used specifically for Christians, particularly the local Greeks and Armenians. It's always considered derogatory.
Gorbatti
(Nubian) It literally means land worker but is used to refer generally to non-Nubians in Egyptian Nubia. The word is composed of two words, (Gor) which means land, and (batti) which means to work.
Goy
(Hebrew, Yiddish; גוי (borrowed into English)) A non-Jew, or gentile. The modern meaning of goy evolved from Biblical Hebrew: in the Bible goy means a nation or a tribe, and can refer to both the nation of Israel and other nations. In English usage the word can sometimes be derogatory.
Gringo
(Latin American Spanish and Portuguese; feminine form gringa) A term used to refer to foreigners in Latin American countries, typically used to refer to those from English-speaking countries. It can be used, depending on country of origin, to mean any non-Spanish speaker, an Anglophone person, a light-haired or light skinned person, or a non-Iberian European.
Guiri
(Spanish) A term originally to refer to uncouth foreign tourists, particularly from the United Kingdom but is applied to include people from other Northern European countries.
Gweilo
(Cantonese) A Cantonese term literally meaning "ghost man" though often translated to English as foreign devil used to refer to Europeans in a derogatory manner.

== H ==
Haole
(Hawaiian, widely adopted in English, pronounced: How-leh) A universal term for foreigner, can be used for people, plants or animals that are non-Hawaiian in origin. The phrase has been linked to anti-foreigner hate crimes in Hawaii.
Heathen
Refers to those who are not Christian, Jewish or Muslim. The term is old-fashioned and derogatory.

== J ==
Juddin
(Persian) Non-Zoroastrian

== K ==
Kafir
(Arabic, كافر kāfir; plural كفّار kuffār) A non-Muslim, may include People of the Book (a term including Christians and Jews) depending on context. Kafir is sometimes deployed in disputes between groups of self-professed Muslims. The term may be seen as outdated and derogatory.

Kawaja
(Sudanese Dinka) Used to refer to a purely white person with no black ancestry. Not derogatory in any usage.

== M ==
Mawali
(Arabic; موالي) A classical term for a non-Arab Muslim. Fell out of use after the Abbasid revolution.
Mleccha
(Sanskrit); A Vedic Sanskrit term for a non-Aryan person. In recent times has taken on a derogatory meaning for non-Hindus.

== N ==
Nemets, wikt:немец
In the past the term referred to any European non-Slavic foreigner, derived from the word "nemoy", 'mute', i.e., a person that cannot speak comprehensively (for Russians). Eventually it acquired the modern meaning of 'German person'.
Nerus, wikt:нерусь
Literally "non-Russian"; a xenophobic slur used by Russian nationalists.
Ne nash/ ne nashi
Literally "not-ours"; a xenophobic slur used by Russian-American Spiritual Christian Dukh-i-zhizniki to refer to outsiders, even if from a similar faith, but thus rejected spiritually and socially.

== O ==
Odar
(Armenian; օտար) meaning stranger or outsider, refers to anything and anyone that is not Armenian.

Oegugin
(Korean; 외국인) meaning foreigner or alien. Used frequently in daily life by Koreans to refer to non-Korean people who are visiting or living in Korea, particularly people who aren't East Asian. The related slang term oekuk-saran modifies correct Korean -gug to -kuk to imitate a common mispronunciation by foreigners. This may be considered derogatory.

== P ==
Palagi
(Samoan, pronounced Palangi) A term used throughout the South Pacific to refer to (typically Caucasian) non-Polynesian foreigners.
Pākehā
(Maori, adopted into English) A Maori term for non-Polynesians living in New Zealand, usually used for those of European descent specifically, though also used for non-Maori in general. In its narrower definition, acceptance of the term varies amongst those it describes. It is commonly used by a range of journalists and columnists from The New Zealand Herald, New Zealand's largest-circulation daily newspaper. It is accepted wholeheartedly by some of the people it describes but was dropped as a descriptive term from the 2001 census because of potential offence.

== S ==
Stranac
Serbo-Croatian (Cyrillic spelling стра́нац) a term literally meaning stranger, used in the countries that made up Former Yugoslavia to refer to any foreigner or alien. The term is still used legally in Bosnia and Herzegovina but has been phased out of use in Croatia and Slovenia.

== T ==
Tapuia
A Tupi term used in the colonial period of Brazil for all non-Tupi indigenous peoples.

== W ==
*Walhaz
Proto-Germanic term for speakers of non-Germanic languages, which is the etymological origin for the names for Wales, Walloonie, and Wallachia.

Wasi'chu
Term for a non-indigenous, particularly white person in the Sioux Dakota and Lakota languages. Widely adopted in English in works critical of colonialism on the erroneous, folk-etymology belief that it derives from the term for "he who takes the fat."

== Y ==
Yankee
An uncommon term used among the Amish of Geauga County, Ohio to refer to non-Amish people.

Also traditionally used by American Southerners to describe anyone in the U.S. from outside the South, or anyone not a part of historical Southern culture.

== See also ==
- List of ethnic slurs
- List of religious slurs
