= Lists of pejorative terms for people =

Lists of pejorative terms for people include:

- List of ethnic slurs
  - List of ethnic slurs and epithets by ethnicity
  - List of common nouns derived from ethnic group names
- List of religious slurs
- List of age-related terms with negative connotations
- List of disability-related terms with negative connotations
- Category:Political pejoratives for people
- Category:Sex- and gender-related slurs

== See also ==
- Dysphemism
- Insult
- Lists of nicknames
- Pejorative
