= Catherinette =

French label for an unmarried 25-year-old woman

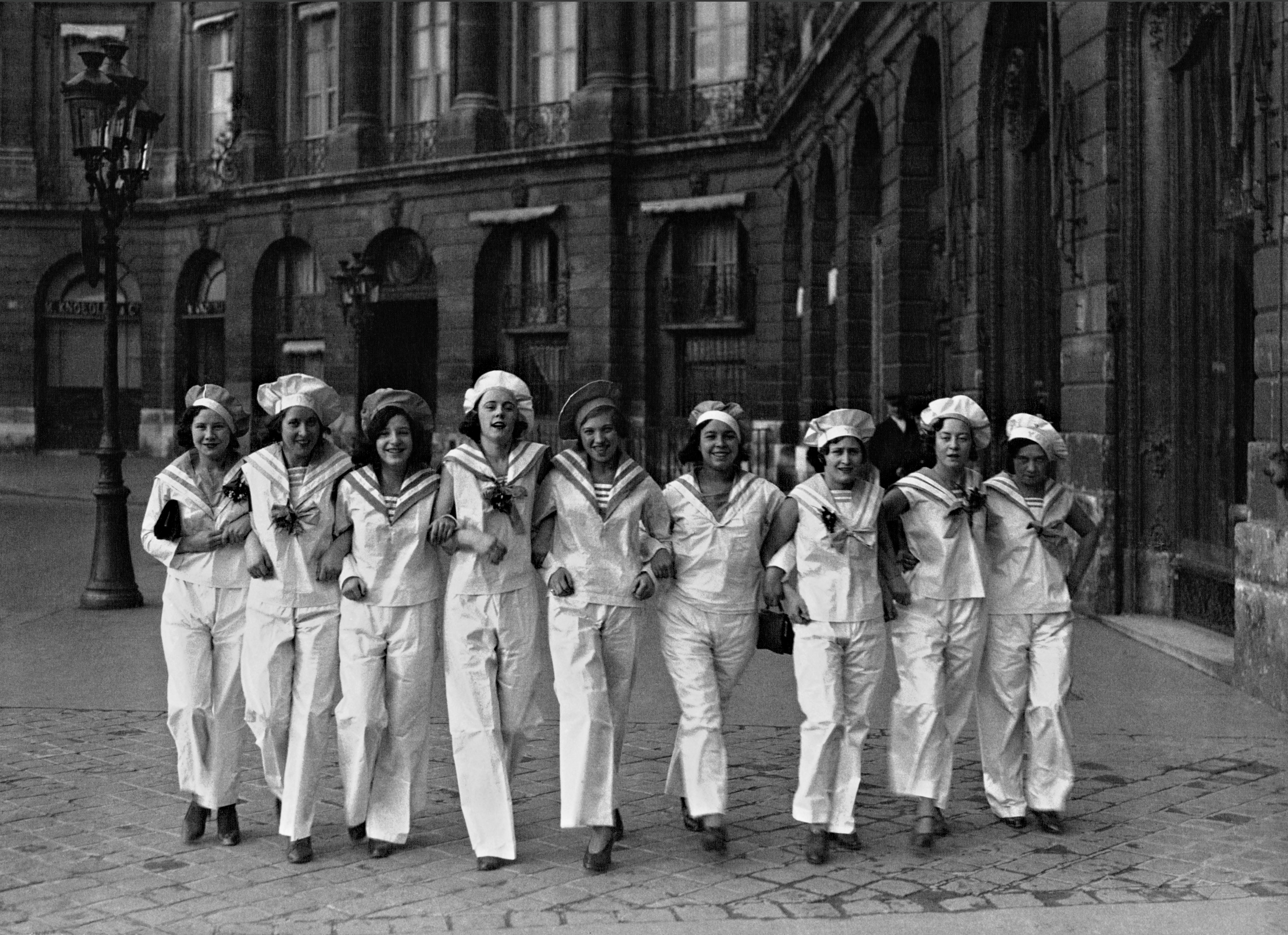
Catherinettes in Paris on rue de la Paix in 1932

Catherinette was a traditional French label for a woman of twenty-five years who was still unmarried by the Feast of Saint Catherine (25 November). A special celebration was offered to them on this day and everyone wished them a swift end to their single status.

Although the term has become rather old-fashioned in France, it is still sometimes used to refer to 25-year-old single women.

The derogatory terms "spinster" and "old maid" were used in a similar context in the English-speaking world. In modern China, the slang term sheng nü describes "leftover women". In Japan, the metaphor "Christmas cake" has been used for women unmarried after 25, although the use of this term has declined over time.

== Origin ==
Since the Middle Ages, women had been under the protection of Saint Catherine (whilst Saint Nicholas cared for men). Women who participated in the group devoted to their saint were responsible for the confection of a beautiful headdress to "cap" her statue each year on 25 November. Young women left the group when marrying, hence "capping Saint Catherine" became synonymous with "still being a single woman at/after 25". Following the changes in the status of women and marriage in society, this custom progressively died all over France, with the exception of the hatmaking and dressmaking trades, wherein unmarried women, after they turned twenty-five, would attend a ball on Saint Catherine's Day in a hat made specially for the occasion; to wear such a hat was referred to as "capping Saint Catherine" (coiffer sainte Catherine).
