= Wasi'chu =

Word used in English derived from Lakota and Dakota word for non-Indigenous people

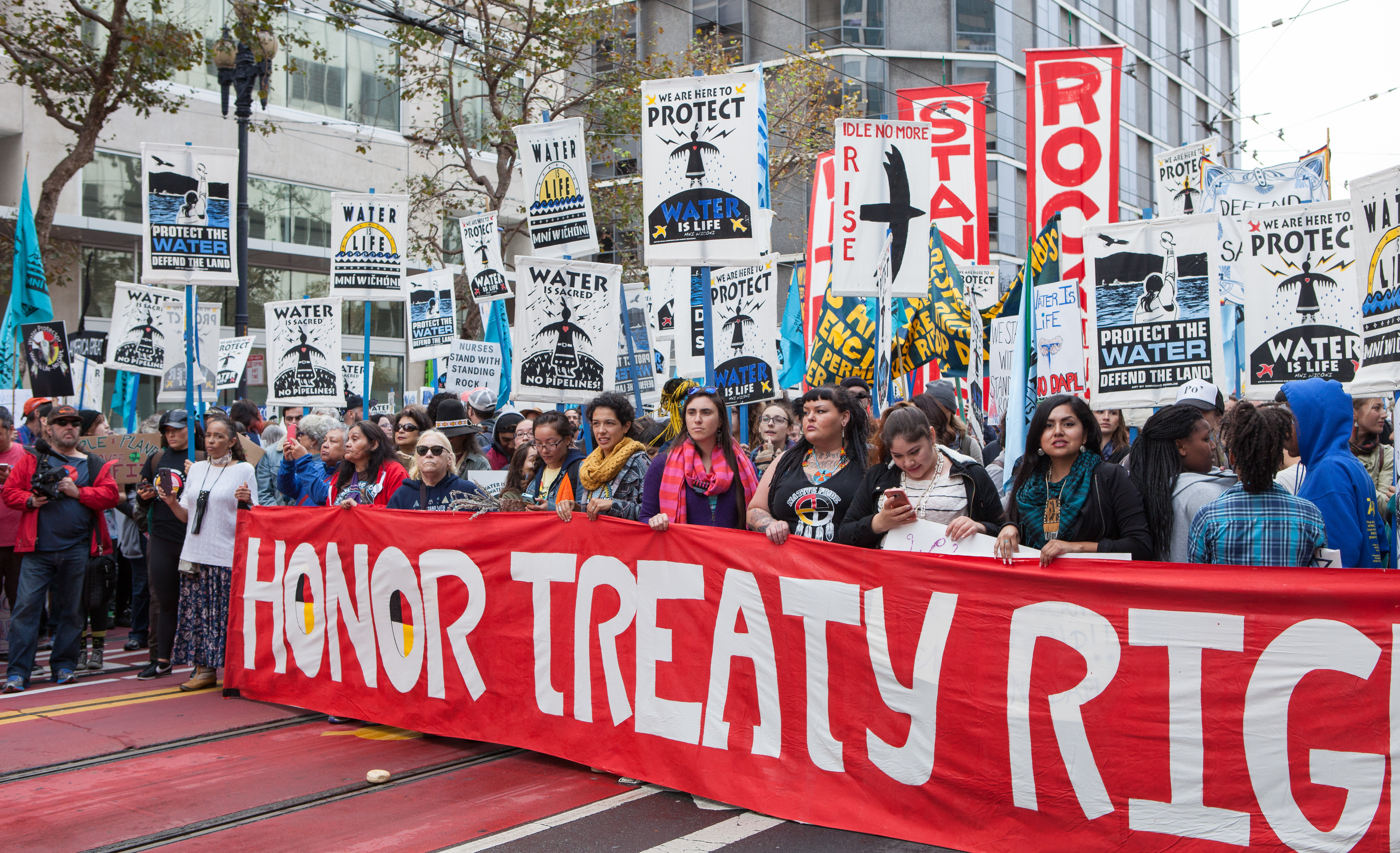
Sioux people's and allies' protests against the Dakota Access Pipeline in 2016-17 were often framed as a fight against wasi'chu interests. In modern usage, the word implies colonialist greed and corporate power.

Wasi'chu is a loanword from the Sioux language (wašíču or waṡicu using different Lakota and Dakota language orthographies) which means a non-Indigenous person, particularly a white person, often with a disparaging meaning.

The word has been widely adopted in English since the 1970s based on the belief that it literally means "fat taker" or greedy person and therefore carries an implied critique of white people and colonialism. Academic linguistic studies of the etymology of wašíču propose other origins for the word.

That the word's underlying meaning is "fat-taker" or "greedy" is today affirmed by many Sioux people themselves, either as the word's origin or as a modern evolution of the meaning. For example, academic and campaigner Nick Estes writes "the highest insult in Lakota is to be greedy, to be wasicu".

== Etymology ==
An often-cited etymology claims that the term wašíču derives from "he who takes the fat", from Lakota wašiƞ ("cooking fat") + cu ("to take"). This etymology/meaning is not present in online Dakota and Lakota dictionaries and is not present or is rejected in discussions of wašíču by academic linguists.

Though many Sioux people themselves now report "he who takes the fat" as the original meaning of wašíču, this explanation of the word may be a relatively recent phenomenon. Linguist David R. Roth, writing in 1975 about the etymology of wašíču, reports that at that time Sioux people mostly believed the term wašíču came from iwašičuƞ meaning talkative or mouthy.

Allan R Taylor, responding to Roth in 1976 rejects "mouthy" as the origin of wašíču and further considers and rejects "he who takes the fat", stating that, "It is implausible as a source.. ..since it ignores the necessarily nasalized vowel in wasį 'bacon' [fat]". Taylor analyses the word as wa + šíču where wa is a particle meaning "something coming from doing an action." He suggests that the original meaning of wašíču can be more readily explained as simply "doer" referring to the colonialists' access to technology unavailable to the Sioux. This closely parallels the etymology of words in other Native American languages meaning "white man."

== Wasi'chu in contemporary English language sources ==
Based on the understanding of the term as meaning "he who takes the fat," wasi'chu has been widely discussed as a reflection of how Sioux people perceive non-Indigenous people's relationship with the land and Indigenous Americans. As such, wasi'chu has been often used in English language materials since around 1970, with English language usage of the term rising sharply in the 2010s. This has included works of popular history in art, and in popular media; for example, as the title of an episode of the TV show Law and Order: Criminal Intent (2006), and in dialogue heard in Dances with Wolves (1990), Thunderheart (1992), White People documentary (2015), The Stand (2020), Yellowstone (2021), and Tulsa King (2022).

== Derived and related terms ==
While it is commonly described as referring to white people a form of the term, "waṡicu ha sapa" (literally black wašíču) can be used to refer to African-Americans. Wašíču Ikčéka (Ordinary Whites) is the name for French people, and Wašíču Ikčéka Makȟóčhe is the name for France (Homelands of the Ordinary Whites). The French were among the first Europeans to interact with the Dakota during the fur trade era. Being referred to as Ikčé (ordinary) is an honor in Lakota/Dakota society.

Derived terms in Lakota include kiwašíču ("assimilate") and igluwašíču ("to make oneself like a non-indigenous/white person"). In Dakhótiyapi (Dakota), Waṡicu iapi means the English language.

== See also ==
- List of terms for ethnic out-groups
