= Gabr =

Persian word of non-Muslims

Gabr (Persian: گبر; also geuber, geubre, gabrak, gawr, gaur, gyaur, gabre) is a Persian term originally used to denote a Zoroastrian.

Historically, gabr was a technical term synonymous with mōg, "magus", denoting a follower of Zoroastrianism, and it is with this meaning that the term is attested in very early New Persian texts such as the Shahnameh. In time, gabr came to have a pejorative implication and was superseded in literature by the respectable Zardoshti, "Zoroastrian".

By the 13th century, the word had come to be applied to a follower of any religion other than Islam, and it has "also been used by the Muslim Kurds, Turks, and some other ethnic groups in modified forms to denote various religious communities other than Zoroastrians, sometimes even in the sense of unbeliever." As a consequence of the curtailment of social rights, non-Muslims were compelled to live in restricted areas, which the Muslim populace referred to as Gabristans.

In the Ottoman Empire, the Turkish version gâvur, borrowed into English via French as "giaour", was used to refer to Christians. It is sometimes still used today in former Ottoman territories and carries a strong pejorative meaning.

The etymology of the term is uncertain. "In all likelihood," gabr derives from the Aramaic gabrā, spelt GBRʼ, which. in written Middle Iranian languages. serves as an ideogram that would be read as an Iranian-language word meaning "man." (for the use of ideograms in Middle Iranian languages, see Pahlavi scripts). During the Sasanian Empire (226–651), the ideogram signified a free (i.e. non-slave) peasant of Mesopotamia. After the collapse of the empire and the subsequent rise of Islam, it "seems likely that gabr used already in Sassanian times in reference to a section of Zoroastrian community in Mesopotamia, had been employed by the converted Persians in the Islamic period to indicate their Zoroastrian compatriots, a practice that later spread throughout the country."

It has also been suggested that gabr might be a mispronunciation of Arabic kafir "unbeliever," but that theory has been rejected on linguistic grounds both phonetic and semantic: "there is no unusual sound in kafir that would require phonetic modification", and kafir as a generic word probably would not refer to a specific revealed religion such as Zoroastrianism.

== See also ==
- Majus, the Arabic word for a Zoroastrian.
- Gabrōni, a name for Zoroastrian Dari language, a northwestern Iranian language used by Zoroastrians in Yazd and Kerman
- Zoroastrians in Iran
- ajam, "illiterate", non-Arab, Iranian
- People of the Book
- dhimmi, "protected"
- Irani
- Ateshgah of Baku
