= Goyim riders =

Hungarian ultra-nationalist political movement

Goyim Motorcycle Association
- Abbreviation: GMA, GME
- Founded: 2000
- Affiliations: Our Homeland Movement
- Remarks: Ultranationalism, Hard Euroscepticism, far-right ideology

Goyim riders are members of the Goyim Motorcycle Association (Hungarian: Gój Motoros Egyesület), an anti-Romani and antisemitic Hungarian ultra-nationalist political movement.

== Etymology ==
The name is rooted in the Biblical Hebrew word goy meaning "a people or "a nation", a term that shifted in Yiddish and modern Hebrew to refer to a non-Jew, sometimes pejoratively. A series of philological essays in the premier weekly of the Hungarian liberal literati, Élet és Irodalom (Life and Literature) by "distinguished linguists," discussed the reversal in usage by the Goyim riders which turned the out-group definition into an in-group definition.

== History and membership ==
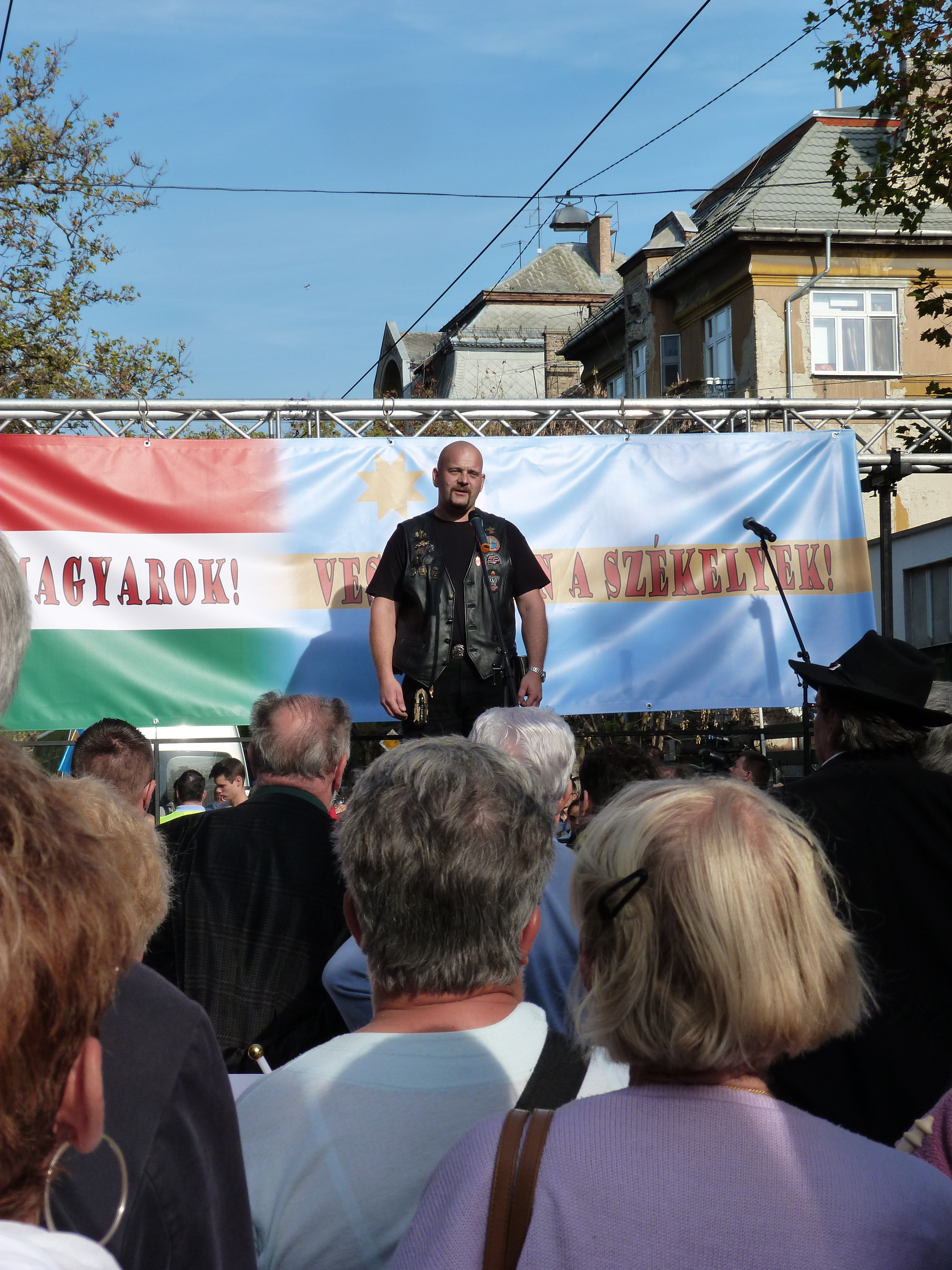
A rider at a 2013 Székely autonomy movement demonstration

The group was informally established by 2000, and organized as a non-profit civic association in 2006.

The group is prosperous, as the ability to afford an expensive, often imported, motorcycle is beyond the means of most working-class Hungarians, and includes prominent figures in business and sports.

== Ideology ==
The group's emblem shows an armed Magyar warrior shooting arrows as he rides a powerful motorcycle, the figure of the warrior superimposed on a map of the pre-World War I Kingdom of Hungary, including the lands lost when Hungary lost that war.

== Activities ==
The riders organize group rides through towns where Romas are accused of committing crimes, rides that are non-violent but perceived as veiled threats.

In 2013 a controversy arose concerning plans by to hold a ride on Holocaust Memorial Day under the banner of "Step on the gas!". This less than subtle attempt at provocation was soon condemned by the Fidesz party as well as the Goyim riders, the latter were originally believed to have been the driving force behind the initiative which was described as "tasteless".
