= Majus =

Term for Zoroastrians

Majūs (Arabic: مجوس) or Magūs (Persian: مگوش) is a term that originally referred to the Magi, the Zoroastrian priestly caste of ancient Persia. In Arabic usage, it was soon generalized to denote all Zoroastrians.

== Etymology ==
The term was borrowed into Arabic via Imperial Aramaic (Imperial Aramaic: 𐡌𐡂𐡅𐡔𐡀, romanized: mḡušā) from the Old Persian (Old Persian: 𐎶𐎦𐎢𐏁, romanized: maguš). The same Old Persian root was independently borrowed into Ancient Greek as mágoi (μάγοι), the term that appears in the Gospel of Matthew.

== Early Islamic texts ==
In early Islamic texts, Majūs was a technical term that initially had no pejorative implications. In the Quran, verse 22:17 lists "the Magians" (al-majūs) alongside Jews, Christians, and Sabians as a distinct religious community that will be subject to God's judgment. Some Islamic scholars have held the theological position that pre-Islamic Arabs were closer to the Abrahamic tradition than the Majūs, whose dualistic theology was seen as fundamentally different. The term was also used in a polemical context by writers such as ibn al-Jawzi, who framed Zoroastrian beliefs as deviations from an Islamic perspective.

== Further slipshod extensions ==
The New Persian term gabr, likely derived from the Aramaic gabrā ("man"), was used as a synonym for Majūs in early texts. Over time, gabr acquired pejorative connotations and is now considered an offensive slur in Persian; the respectful term for a Zoroastrian is Zardoshti. The label "fire-worshipper" is a common but inaccurate description applied to Zoroastrians by non-adherents, based on a misinterpretation of the central role of fire in their rituals.

Historically, the application of the term expanded. Chroniclers in al-Andalus used al-Majūs to describe Viking raiders, likely because Norse practices such as cremation were misinterpreted as fire-worship.

In the 20th century, the term was revived for political purposes. During the Iran-Iraq War in the 1980s, the Ba'athist government of Iraq used majūs in its propaganda to refer to Iranians. This rhetoric was intended to de-legitimise the Iranian population on religious grounds by implying they were not sincere Muslims, but were covertly practicing their pre-Islamic faith. This framing presented the war not only as a matter of Arab nationalism but also as a campaign on behalf of Islam.

More recently, some Salafi and Wahhabi polemicists and extremist groups have used majūs as an anti-Shia slur. This usage attempts to link Shia Islam to its Persian origins, portraying it as a vehicle for pre-Islamic, Majusi beliefs. While distinct from the general Arabic term kafir ("unbeliever"), majus functions as a targeted slur with specific historical and sectarian connotations.

== See also ==
- ajam, "mute", non-Arab, Iranian
- ahl al-Kitab, "People of the Book"
- dhimmi, "protected"
- kafir, "unbeliever"
- Zoroastrians in Iran
- Zoroastrians on the Indian subcontinent
  - Iranis
  - Parsis
