= List of disability-related terms with negative connotations =

The following is a list of terms used to describe disabilities or people with disabilities, which may carry negative connotations or be offensive to people with or without disabilities. Some people consider it best to use person-first language, for example "a person with a disability" rather than "a disabled person". However identity-first language, as in "autistic person" or "deaf person", is preferred by many people and organizations.

Language can influence individuals' perception of disabled people and disability. For some terms, the grammar structure of their use determine if they are harmful. The person-first stance advocates for saying "people with disabilities" instead of "the disabled" or "a person who is deaf" instead of "a deaf person". However, some advocate against this, saying it reflects a medical model of disability whereas "disabled person" is more appropriate and reflects the social model of disability. On the other hand, there is also a grammar structure called identity-first language that construes disability as a function of social and political experiences occurring within a world designed largely for non-disabled people.

== A ==
Term	Notes	References
A few sandwiches short of a picnic	Used of people perceived as having reduced or limited mental faculties. Numerous derivatives with no known original (e.g. "a few books short of a library").	
Able-bodied	There may be an implied value judgement comparing a person with a disability versus one without.	
Abnormal		
Addict		
Afflicted		
Attention-seeking	Used of people who are suffering emotionally	
Acoustic	An intentional malformation of autistic, used as a synonym in pejorative contexts	
Autistic	Or autism, when used as an insult	

== B ==
Term	Notes	References
Batty		
Birth defect		
Blind	Especially when used metaphorically (e.g., "blind to criticism") or preceded by "the", although "the blind" is considered acceptable by many blind people and organizations such as the National Federation of the Blind.	
Bonkers		
Brain damaged		

== C ==
Term	Notes	References
Challenged		
Crazy		
Crazy cat lady	Used of mentally ill and neurotic women, particularly single women and spinsters who hoard cats.	
Cretin		
Cripple	"A person with a physical or mobility impairment". Its shortened form ("crip") has been reclaimed by some people with disabilities as a positive identity.	
Confined to a wheelchair	May imply helplessness, and that someone is to be pitied.	

== D ==
Term	Notes	References
Daft	People considered nonsensical or feckless	
Deaf and dumb or Deaf-mute		
Deaf to X		
Defective	Or other uses of "defect"	
Deformed		
Delusional		
Demented	People with dementia	
Deranged or mentally deranged		
Derp	Considered by some to refer to people with intellectual disabilities	
Differently abled		
Dim or dim-witted		
DALYs/DFLYs/QALYs: Disability or Quality Adjusted (or Free) Life Years	Might suggest that a nondisabled person's life years are worth more than a disabled person's	
The Disabled or Disabled people	May be offensive to some, who may prefer "person with a disability" or "people with health conditions or impairments". However, many people prefer "disabled person" or "disabled people", in part due to the social model of disability.	
Disorder		
Dotard		
Downie	Used of people with Down Syndrome. A Dutch profanity sometimes appearing in English as "downy" and generally considered derogatory	
Dumb	Especially when preceded by "the"	
Dummy and dumb	Used of people with mental disabilities, or more generally people perceived as stupid or ignorant. Once used to describe people incapable of speaking, suggestive of an insulting mannequin-like or ventriloquist's dummy-like appearance.	
Dwarf		

== E ==
Term	Notes	References
Epileptic		

== F ==
Term	Notes	References
Feeble-minded or Feeb		
Fit	In reference to an epileptic seizure	
Flid	People with phocomelia from birth mother's use of thalidomide	
Freak		

== G ==
Term	Notes	References
Gimp or gimpy	A limp or a person with a limp	

== H ==
Term	Notes	References
Handicapped	Especially when preceded by "the" or "physically"	
Handicapable		
Hare lip		
Hearing-impaired		
Homebound		
Hunchback, or "humpback"	Especially when referring to people with scoliosis or kyphosis. Generated controversy after the 1990s release of The Hunchback of Notre Dame (see Quasimodo below).	
Hyper		
Hyper-sensitive		
Hysterical	Typically used in reference to women	

== I ==
Term	Notes	References
Imbecile	Was originally the diagnostic term used for people with IQ scores between 30 and 50 when the IQ test was first developed in the early 1900s. It is no longer used professionally. Before the IQ test was developed in 1905, "imbecile" was also commonly used as a casual insult towards anyone perceived as incompetent at doing something.	
Incapacitated		
Idiot	Was originally the diagnostic term used for people with IQ scores under 30 when the IQ test was first developed in the early 1900s. It is also no longer used professionally. Before the IQ test was developed in 1905, "idiot" was also commonly used as a casual insult towards anyone perceived as incompetent at doing something.	
Illiterate	Some now consider the term imprecise and blaming the person for something caused by the condition of the educational system.	
Inmate	When referring to a psychiatric admission	
Insane		
Inspirational or inspiring	When used about somebody doing a ordinary activity, a phenomenon of spectacle known as "inspiration porn" that is based on pity; not to be confused with public activities of mass spectacle such as Special Olympics or Paralympics, which celebrate talent without pity or mockery.	
Invalid		

== J ==
Term	Notes	References
Junkie		

== L ==
Term	Notes	References
Lame	In reference to difficulty walking or moving. The term has since been adopted into slang to generally refer to something or someone as "meaningless" or "without worth", e.g. "He told us a lame excuse for why he had not done the work."	
Losing one's mind		
Losing / Lost one's marbles		
LPC: Likely to become a public charge		
Lunatic or looney		

== M ==
Term	Notes	References
Mad, madman, madwoman	Some individuals with mental illness tend to use this term to change the negative stigma surrounding it (see Mad Pride)	
Mad as a hatter or Mad hatter	Derogatory term (referring to a mentally ill person or a person with brain damage and dementia caused by heavy metal poisoning) popularized especially due to the fictional character of the same name	
Maniac		
Mental, mentally deficient, mental case or mentally ill		
Midget		
Mong, Mongol, Mongoloid, or Mongolism	Used of people with Down syndrome	
Moron, moronic		
Munchkin	See "Midget" above. A term derived from the 1930s feature film The Wizard of Oz which had a cast of Little Persons.	
Mute		
Mutant	referring to someone with an uncommon genetic mutation	

== N ==
Term	Notes	References
Narc, narcissist		
Neurospicy		
Not the brightest bulb / Not the sharpest tool in the shed	Mentally disabled derogatory term	
Nut, nuts, or nutter, nuthouse, etc.		

== O ==
Term	Notes	References
Out to lunch	Mentally disabled derogatory term	

== P ==
Term	Notes	References
Patient		
Paraplegic		
Psycho(tic)		
Psychopath	A dated term used for a person with a mental illness	

== Q ==
Term	Notes	References
Quasimodo	Translates to "half-formed" or more commonly "deformed", and made infamous by the fictional character Quasimodo, a deformed man with kyphosis who later appeared in a popular Disney film in the 1990s (see Hunchback above)	

== R ==
Term	Notes	References
Retard/Retarded	Before the 1990s this was considered acceptable by most non-disabled people and organizations. Also known as "the r-word".	
Restarted	Algospeak for "retarded".	

== S ==
Term	Notes	References
Scatterbrained		
Schizo	Especially as an adjective, meaning "erratic" or "unpredictable" or, for the former two, to refer to an individual	
Schizophrenic	When referring to an individual	
(has a) Screw loose	British slang term that originally meant eccentric, neurotic or slightly mentally ill; generally considered offensive to mentally ill people	
Senile		
Slow		
Sluggish		
Sociopath		
Spastic/Spaz	Especially in the UK and Ireland. Previously referred to muscle spasticity or a person with cerebral palsy, which may involve muscle spasms. Also used to insult someone uncoordinated or making jerking movements.	
Special		
Special needs		
SPED	An acronym of "special ed" (short for "special education")	
Stone deaf		
Stricken		
Stupid		
Subnormal		
Supercrip		
Sufferer		

== T ==
Term	Notes	References
Tard	Short for "retard"; see retard above.	
Thick		
Tone deaf		

== U ==
Term	Notes	References
Unclean		
Unfortunate		
Unhinged		

== V ==
Term	Notes	References
Victim of an ailment		
Vegetable		
Vegetative state		

== W ==
Term	Notes	References
Wacko		
Wheelchair bound	Preferred use by some is "person who uses a wheelchair"	
Window licker		

== Y ==
Term	Notes	References
Yuppie flu	Used as a pejorative term for chronic fatigue syndrome (CFS). This originated from the media stereotype of people with CFS as ambitious, young, and affluent ("yuppies"), rather than having a genuine illness.	

== See also ==
- Ableism
- List of age-related terms with negative connotations
- List of ethnic slurs
