= Sheng nü =

Derogatory term in China for unmarried women in their late twenties

Sheng nü (Chinese: 剩女; pinyin: shèngnǚ), common translation: leftover women or "leftover ladies") is a derogatory term popularized by the All-China Women's Federation that classifies women who remain unmarried in their late twenties and beyond. Most prominently used in China, the term has also been used colloquially to refer to women in India, North America, Europe, and other parts of Asia. The term compares unmarried women to leftover food and has gone on to become widely used in the mainstream media and has been the subject of several television series, magazine and newspaper articles, and book publications, focusing on the negative connotations and positive reclamation of the term.

While initially backed and disseminated by pro-government media in 2007, the term eventually came under criticism from government-published newspapers two years later. Xu Xiaomin of The China Daily described the sheng nus as "a social force to be reckoned with" and others have argued the term should be taken as a positive to mean "successful women". The slang term 3S or 3S Women, meaning "single, seventies (1970s), and stuck", has also been used in place of sheng nü.

The equivalent term for men, guang gun ("bare branches"), is used to refer to men who do not marry and thus do not add 'branches' to the family tree. Similarly, shengnan (剩男), 'leftover men', has also been used. Scholars have noted that this term is not as commonly used as "leftover women" in Chinese society and that single males reaching a certain age will often be labeled as either 'golden bachelors' (黄金单身汉) or 'diamond single men' (钻石王老五).

== Background ==
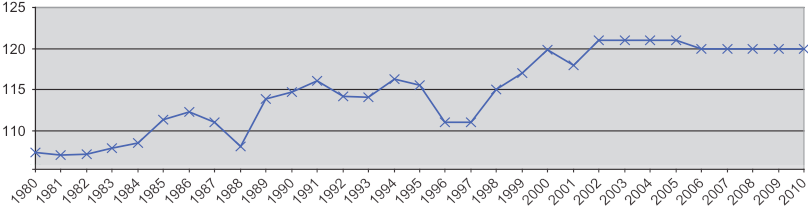
Sex ratio at birth in mainland China, males per 100 females, 1980–2010

As a long-standing tradition, early-age marriage was prevalent in China's past. It was until 2005, that merely 2% of females aged between 30 and 34 were single. By contrast, 10% of the males were single. China's one-child policy (Family Planning Program) and sex-selective abortions have led to a disproportionate growth in the country's gender balance. Approximately 20 million more men than women have been born since the one-child policy was introduced in 1979, or 120 males born for every 100 females. By 2020, China is expected to have 24 million more men than women. The global average is 103 to 107 newborn males per 100 females.

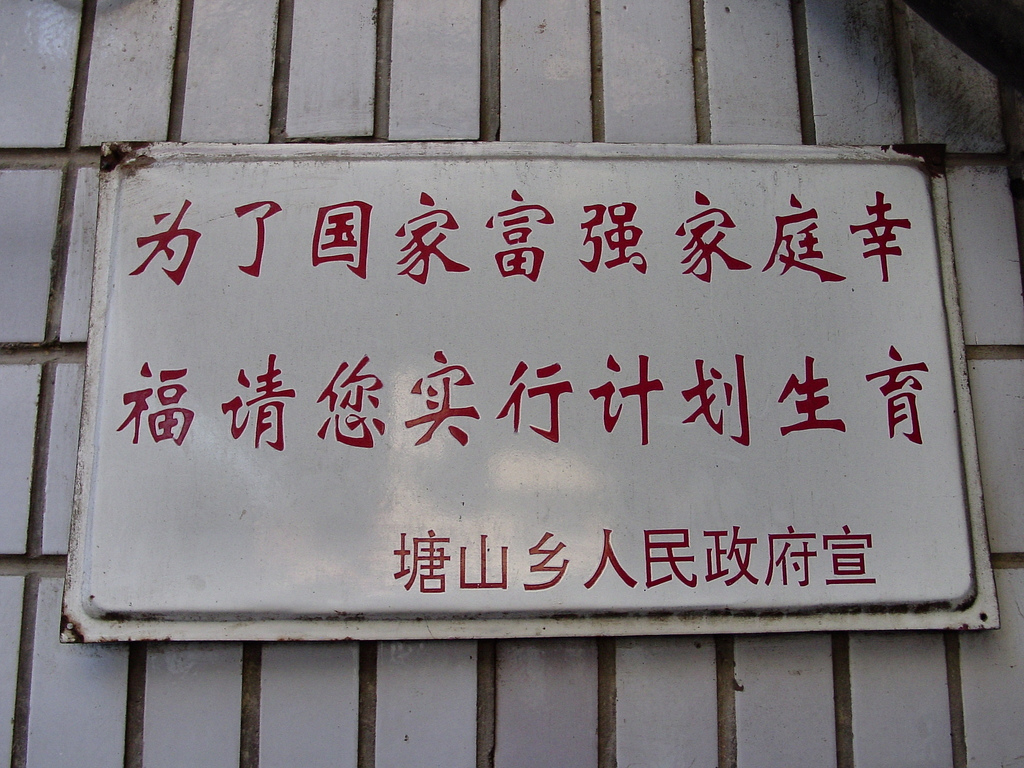
Government sign stating: "For a prosperous, powerful nation and a happy family, please use birth planning."

According to The New York Times, the State Council of the People's Republic of China (Central People's Government) issued an "edict" in 2007 regarding the Population and Family Planning Program (one-child-policy) to address the urgent gender imbalance and cited it as a major "threat to social stability". The council further cited "upgrading population quality (suzhi)" as one of its primary goals and appointed the All-China Women's Federation, a state agency established in 1949 to "protect women's rights and interests", to oversee and resolve the issue.

The exact etymology of the term is not conclusively known, but most reliable sources cite it as having entered the mainstream in 2006. The China Daily reported in 2011 that Xu Wei, the editor-in-chief of the Cosmopolitan Magazine China, coined the term. The term, sheng nu, literally translates to "leftover ladies" or "leftover women". The China Daily newspaper further reported that the term originally gained popularity in the city of Shanghai and later grew to nationwide prominence. In 2007, the Ministry of Education of the People's Republic of China released an official statement defining sheng nu as any "unmarried women over the age of 27" and added it to the national lexicon. According to several sources, the government mandated the All-China Women's Federation to publish series of articles stigmatizing unwed women who were in their late twenties.

In March 2011, the All-China Women's Federation posted a controversial article titled 'Leftover Women Do Not Deserve Our Sympathy' shortly after International Women's Day. An excerpt states, "Pretty girls do not need a lot of education to marry into a rich and powerful family. But girls with an average or ugly appearance will find it difficult" and "These girls hope to further their education in order to increase their competitiveness. The tragedy is, they don't realise that as women age, they are worth less and less. So by the time they get their MA or PhD, they are already old – like yellowed pearls." Originally at least 15 articles were available on its website relating to the subject of sheng nu, which have now been subsequently removed, that included matchmaking advice and tips.

== China ==
=== Culture and statistics ===
The National Bureau of Statistics of the People's Republic of China (NBS) and state census figures reported approximately 1 in 5 women between the ages of 25-29 remain unmarried. In contrast, the proportion of unwed men in that age range is much higher, sitting at around 1 in 3. In a 2010 Chinese National Marriage Survey, it was reported that 9 out of 10 men believe that women should be married before they are 27 years old. 7.4% of Chinese women between 30 and 34 were unmarried and the percentage falls to 4.6% between the ages 35–39. In comparison with neighbouring countries with similar traditional values, China has much higher female marriage rates. Despite being categorized as a "relatively rare" demographic, the social culture and traditions of China have put the issue in the social spotlight.

Under the context of the one-child policy, gender selective abortion caused the male population in China to exceed that of women; more than 10% of men over 50 will choose not to enter into marriage in 2044.

A study of married couples in China noted that men tended to marry down the socio-economic ladder. "There is an opinion that A-quality guys will find B-quality women, B-quality guys will find C-quality women, and C-quality men will find D-quality women," says Huang Yuanyuan. "The people left are A-quality women and D-quality men. So if you are a leftover woman, you are A-quality." A University of North Carolina demographer who studies China's gender imbalance, Yong Cai, further notes that "men at the bottom of society get left out of the marriage market, and that same pattern is coming to emerge for women at the top of society".

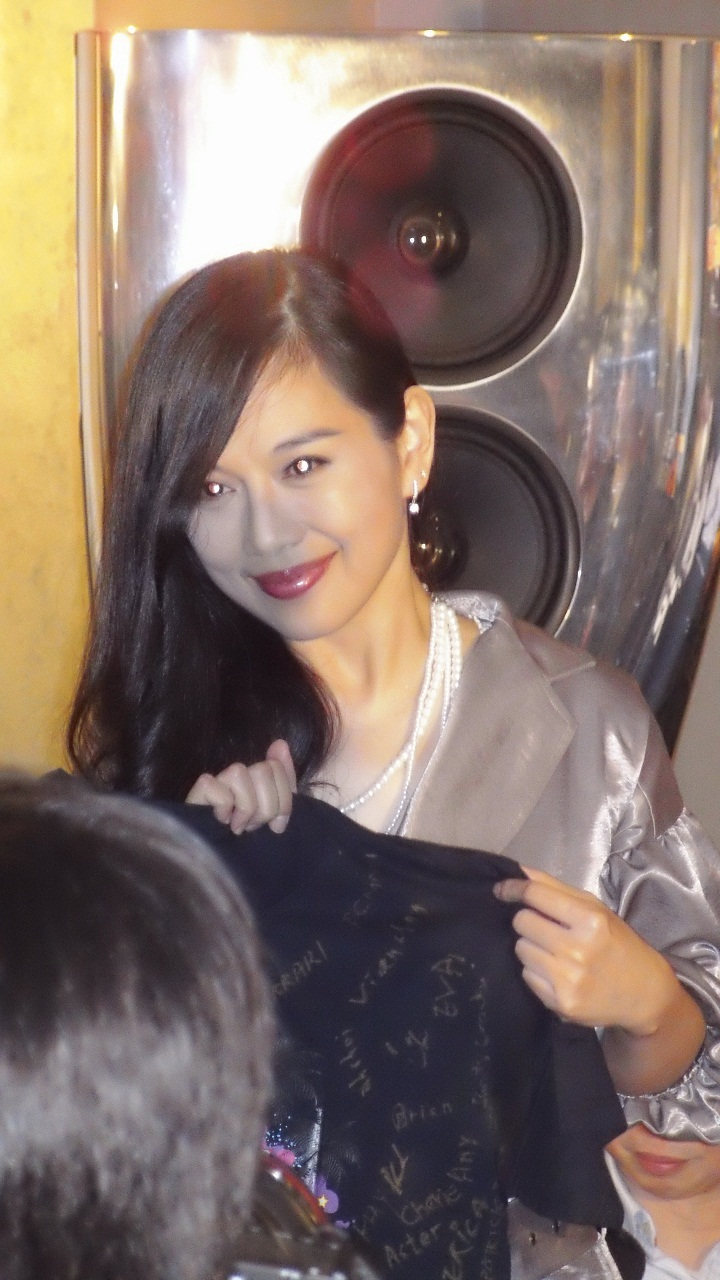
Hong Kong actress Adia Chan starred in the drama television series You Are the One portraying the eldest, career-minded sibling.

China, and many other Asian countries, share a long history of conservative and patriarchal view of marriage and the family structure including marrying at a young age and hypergamy. The pressure from society and family has been the source criticism, shame, social embarrassment and social anxiety for many women who are unmarried. Chen, another woman interviewed by the BBC, said the sheng nu are "afraid their friends and neighbours will regard me as abnormal. And my parents would also feel they were totally losing face, when their friends all have grandkids already". Similar sentiment has been shared amongst other women in China, particularly amongst recent university graduates. A report by CNN cited a survey of 900 female university graduates across 17 Chinese universities where approximately 70 percent of those surveyed said "their greatest fear is becoming a 3S lady".

Under the patriarchal system in China, males tend to come under substantial financial pressure. For example, in China, great importance is often attached to male ownership of a property and a vehicle. This is evidenced in a survey which revealed that less than 20% of parents of daughters do not consider the ownership of a property as a precondition for marriage. This may have caused people to lay the blame on women. Moreover, the social image of so-called "Shengnus" is characterized by monetary worship, egocentricity and selfishness. Besides, people consider "Shengnu" as setting the bar high for their future partner but lacking in the virtues required as a tradition in the old times. Some females regard marriage as a springboard to improve the quality of their life. At one of the most popular dating TV show broadcast in China, a female participant blatantly claimed that "I'd rather cry in a BMW than laugh on a bicycle" when an unemployed male participant questioned her whether or not she is willing to take a ride on bike. This remark went viral instantly on social media in China, and attracted widespread criticism from many unmarried females.

The increasing popularity of unwed women in China has been largely accredited to the growing educated middle class. Women are more free and able to live independently in comparison to previous generations. Forbes reported that in 2013, "11 of the 20 richest self-made women in the world are Chinese". In addition, it cites that Chinese female CEOs make up 19 percent of women in management jobs making it the second highest worldwide after Thailand. A rapidly growing trend in premarital sex has been commonly surveyed and noted amongst women in China. In 1989, 15% of Chinese women engaged in premarital sex as compared to 2013, where 60-70% had done so. Chinese Academy of Social Sciences professor Li states that this shows an increase in the types of relationships amongst new generations in China.

The term has also been embraced by some feminists with the opening of 'sheng nu' social clubs. In an interview with fashion editor Sandra Bao by the Pulitzer Center on Crisis Reporting, Bao stated that "many modern, single women in China enjoy their independence and feel comfortable holding out for the right man, even as they grow older." She further explained, "We don't want to make compromises because of age or social pressure".

Between 2008 and 2012, sociologist Sandy To, while at the University of Cambridge, conducted a 'grounded theory method' study in China regarding the topic. To's research focused on "marriage partner choice" by Chinese professional women in the form of a typology of four different "partner choice strategies". The main finding of the study found that contrary to the popular belief that highly educated and single women remain unmarried, or do not want to take on traditional roles in marriage, because of personal preference, that in contrast, they commonly have an appetite for marriage and that their main obstacle is traditional patriarchal attitudes. The study also pointed out that in other Asian countries such as Japan, Singapore, South Korea, and Taiwan, where women have been receiving a higher education, that correspondingly, the average age of marriage amongst them is much higher. The Chinese People's Daily cited a 2012 United Nations survey that found 74 percent of women in the United Kingdom and 70 percent of women in Japan were single between the ages of 25 and 29. The China Daily published an article that cited figures from the 2012 United Nations' World Marriage Data which reported 38% of women in the United States, and more than 50% of women in Britain remained unmarried in their 30s.

=== Media ===
The Chinese media has capitalized on the subject matter with television shows, viral videos, newspapers and magazine articles, and pundits that have sharply criticized women for "waiting it out for a man with a bigger house or fancier car". The television series comedy Will You Marry Me and My Family, which premièred on CCTV-8, revolves around the concept of sheng nü as a family frantically searches for a prospective spouse of the main character who is in her thirties. This series and You Are the One (MediaCorp Channel 8) have been given credit for coining terms like "the shengnu economy" and further bringing the subject into public fascination and obsession. If You Are the One (Jiangsu Satellite Television) is a popular Chinese game show, loosely based on Taken Out, whose rise has been credited with the "national obsession" surrounding sheng nü. The show between 2010 and 2013 was China's most-watched game show.

The media frequently highlights the anxiety people feel about late marriage or even no marriage. Whether in reality shows or dramas, people make jokes about sheng nü. For example, in the TV show iApartment, a female character with a doctoral degree is presented as gender-neutral, implying that she needs to be nice to her boyfriend because it is difficult for a female doctor to find a boyfriend if they break up with each other.

In response to a popular music video called "No Car, No House" about blue-collar Chinese bachelors, another music video called "No House, No Car" was made by a group of women and uploaded on International Women's Day. The video was viewed over 1.5 million times over the first two days on the Chinese video site Youku. Other commercial interests have taken advantage of the situation such as the increased popularity of "boyfriends for hire". The concept has also been turned into a popular television drama series called Renting a Girlfriend for Home Reunion.

The topic has also been the subject of literary works. Hong Kong author Amy Cheung's bestselling novel Hummingbirds Fly Backwards (三个A Cup的女人) depicts the anxieties of three unmarried women on the verge of turning 30.

The Chinese English-language news media has more often challenged the "leftover" myth than perpetuated it. The media representations of leftover women have shown four distinct ideologies, namely ageism, heteronormativity, patriarchy and egalitarianism. Similarly, the Western English-language news media has formulated the female individualisation discourse that emphasises independence and self-actualisation.

=== Longevity and consequences ===
Experts have further theorized about the term's longevity as the National Population and Family Planning Commission moves towards phasing out the one-child policy in favour of an "appropriate and scientific family planning policy (one-child policy)" where the child limit may be increased. He Feng in The China Daily points out, "the sheng nu phenomenon is nothing like the feminist movement in the West, in which women consciously demanded equal rights in jobs and strived for independence." Rather, the change has been "subtle" and that "perhaps decades later, will be viewed as symbolic of China's social progress and a turning point for the role of women in its society."

In an article by the South China Morning Post, it concludes, "with mounting pressure and dwindling hopes of fulfilling both career and personal ambitions at home, for women such as Xu the urge to pack up and leave only grows stronger with time. Without women such as her, though, the mainland will be left with not only a weaker economy, but an even greater pool of frustrated leftover men."

Divorce rates in Shanghai and Beijing, China's two most populated economic centres, have been steadily rising since 2005 with it reaching 30% in 2012. In 2016, divorce rates rose by 8.3% from 2015 to 4.2 million. At the same time, in 2017, marriage rates have declined since 2013 to 8.3%, down from a peak of 9.9% in 2013. These among other contributing factors such as online dating and the upward mobility of people have been attributed to pushing the average age of marriage in China to 27, up from 20 in 1950, making it closer to global marriage trends.

== Sheng Nu Movement ==
=== Influence of media in the movement ===
The Sheng Nu Movement uses the internet and media as outlets to remove the stigma against leftover women. SK-II, a Japanese skincare brand, launched in the early 1980s, has launched a global campaign called #changedestiny, to empower women affected by the prejudice against "leftover women". In their campaign video, "Marriage Market Takeover", stories of women who overcame the challenges of being unmarried after they turn 27. The video includes interviews from leftover women. In the interview, Wang Xiao Qi describes how her parents pushed her into marriage by arguing that "marriage doesn't wait". She refutes them by saying, "even if I don't have a significant other half, I can still live wonderfully". The commercial was launched with the idea of taking over the "Marriage Market", a place where Chinese parents essentially advertise children as marriage potential, listing their height, weight, salary, values and personality.

=== Reaction ===
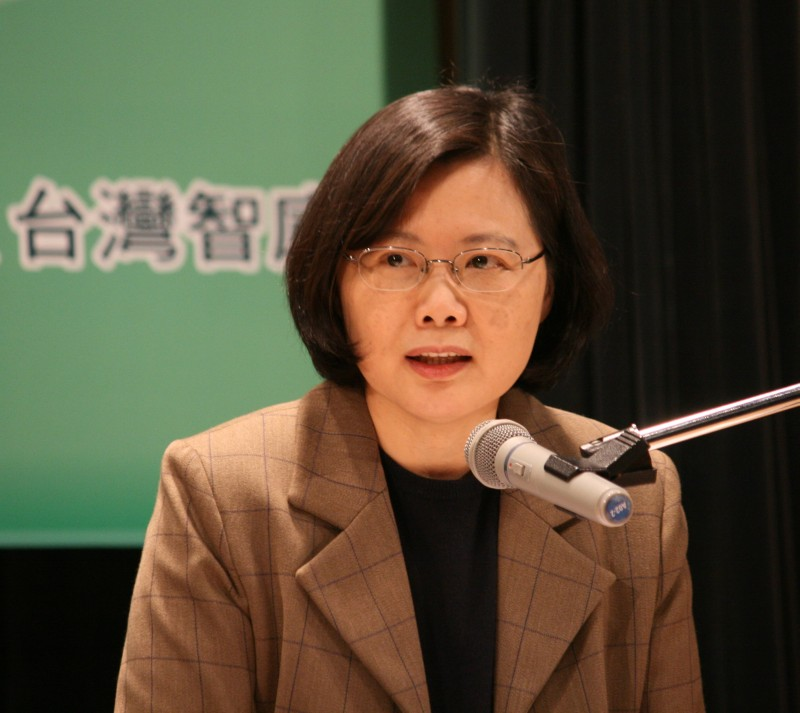
Tsai Ing-wen, seventh president of the Republic of China, won the 2016 Taiwan election while being labelled a leftover woman.

Powerful figures of modern-day China have publicly expressed irritation towards the growing feminist movement in their male-dominated society. Feng Gang, a leading sociologist, posted on social media, "History has proved that academia is not the domain of women". Xu Youzhe, the CEO of one of China's most popular gaming companies, Duoyi Network, said, "If a woman in her lifetime has fewer than two children, no matter how hard she works, she is destined to be unhappy".

China's government has also been known to combat the growing feminist movement in China. On International Women's Day in 2015, feminists in China were detained for publicly raising awareness about sexual harassment on public transportation. Five women in Beijing were also arrested and sent to a detention center by the Public Security Bureau for handing out feminist stickers. In 2017, Women's Voices, a social media account run by China's most prominent feminists, was suspended with no specific explanation why.

The first female president of Taiwan, Tsai Ing-Wen, aged 59 at the time she assumed office, was criticized for being an unmarried president and so-called 'leftover woman'. The Chinese state newspaper Xinhua shamed Tsai Ing-Wen by commenting, "As a single female politician, she lacks the emotional drag of love, the pull of the 'home,' and no children to care for."

Chinese women have taken initiative to form social clubs where they support one another over the pressures of marriage and motherhood. According to an article published in The Atlantic, these social groups have over 1,000 members. Sandra Bao is a fashion magazine editor who co-founded a social group known as "Leftover Attitude" in Shanghai as a way to support unmarried professional women. She says, "Parents are pressuring us, the media label us, there's a whole industry of matchmakers and others out there telling us it's a problem to be single".

Recently, feminists in China changed the original meaning of "leftover women"("剩女") into "'victorious' women" ("胜女"), but retained the pronunciation of shengnu. The intent was to emphasize the independence gained by single women. In fact, unlike the social image imposed on shengnu, most unmarried females living in urban areas do not value wealth as the sole criterion when they search for a spouse, even though they will not completely ignore that.

=== Sexism in China ===
Sexism is prominent in China's workforce, where women are either expected to meet China's many societal standards or aren't given any opportunities at all on the basis of their gender. In male-dominated areas such as technology and construction, one of the requirements needed to get the job may actually require the applicant to be a male. According to the South China Morning Post, Gender discrimination is deeply ingrained in Chinese society, which, for centuries, was dominated by Confucianism which places women as inferior to men.

Gender discrimination also occurs in employment where women have to fit certain physical features to be hired. Sexism exists in the Chinese employment system. Brian Stauffer from Human Rights Watch describes "Sexual objectification of women—treating women as a mere object of sexual desire—is prevalent in Chinese job advertising. Some job postings require women to have certain physical attributes—with respect to height, weight, voice, or facial appearance—that are completely irrelevant to the execution of job duties".

Legal actions have been taken against sexism in China's job field. In 2014, a woman named Cao Ju was refused a job in the private tutoring firm Juren in Beijing based on the fact that she was a woman. The company settled for 30,000 yuan for what's known to be "China's first gender discrimination lawsuit". Cao justified her actions by stating that "[I] think as long as the person is capable of doing the work the post requires, gender is irrelevant". Traditional patriarchy and modern egalitarianism shape Chinese womanhood within the Chinese sociocultural context.

== In other cultures ==
=== United States ===
Comparisons have been made to a 1986 Newsweek cover and featured article that said "women who weren't married by 40 had a better chance of being killed by a terrorist than of finding a husband". Newsweek eventually apologized for the story and in 2010 launched a study that discovered 2 in 3 women who were 40 and single in 1986 had married since. The story caused a "wave of anxiety" and some "skepticism" amongst professional and highly educated women in the United States. The article was cited several times in the 1993 Hollywood film Sleepless in Seattle starring Tom Hanks and Meg Ryan. The Chinese People's Daily noted a United Nations study, mentioned earlier, that in the United States in 2012, nearly half of all women between 25 and 29 were single.

The term bachelorette is used to describe any unmarried woman who is still single. The popular American reality television series The Bachelorette capitalizes on matchmaking successful businesswomen in their mid- to late twenties with eligible bachelors.

Former Los Angeles deputy mayor Joy Chen, a Chinese-American, wrote a book titled Do Not Marry Before Age 30 (2012). Chen's book, a pop culture bestseller, was commissioned and published by the Chinese government as a self-help book for unmarried women. In an earlier interview with The China Daily, she said, "We should not just try to find a 'Mr Right Now', but a 'Mr Right Forever'". The same year, Chen was named "Woman of the Year" by the All-China Women's Federation.

=== Other countries ===
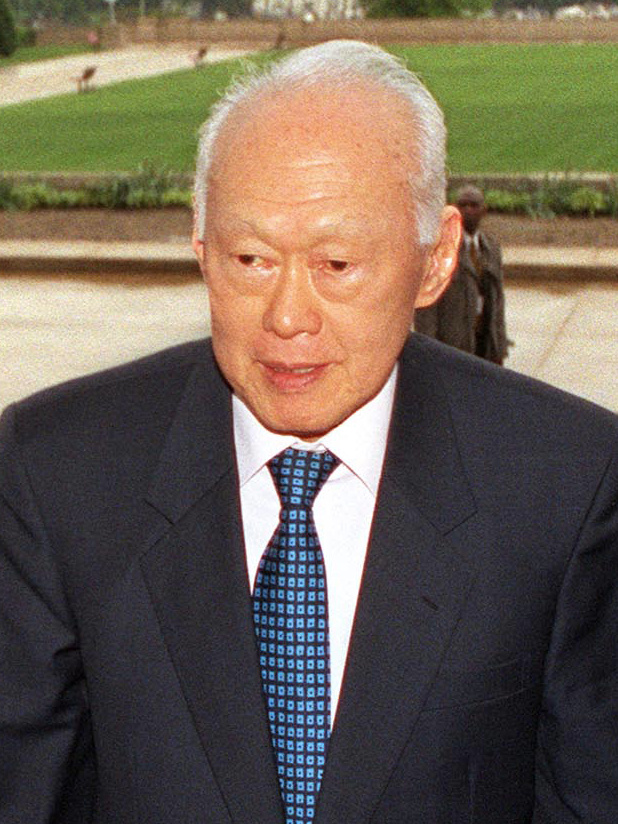
Former Prime Minister of Singapore Lee Kuan Yew visiting the United States in 2002

Singapore is noted to have gone through a similar period. In 1983, then-Prime Minister of Singapore Lee Kuan Yew sparked the "Great Marriage Debate" when he encouraged Singapore men to choose highly educated women as wives. He was concerned that a large number of graduate women were unmarried. Some sections of the population, including graduate women, were upset by his views. Nevertheless, a match-making agency Social Development Unit (SDU) was set up to promote socialising among men and women graduates. In the Graduate Mothers Scheme, Lee also introduced incentives such as tax rebates, schooling, and housing priorities for graduate mothers who had three or four children, in a reversal of the over-successful 'Stop-at-Two' family planning campaign in the 1960s and 1970s. By the late 1990s, the birth rate had fallen so low that Lee's successor Goh Chok Tong extended these incentives to all married women, and gave even more incentives, such as the 'baby bonus' scheme. Lee reaffirmed his controversial position in his personal memoir, From Third World to First, "many well-educated Singaporean women did not marry and have children."

The 2012 UN study cited by the Chinese People's Daily reported that in Britain 74 percent and in Japan 70 percent of all women between 25 and 29 were single. A similar feature in the People's Daily focused on the reception of the concept of sheng nü from netizens outside of China, particularly in Asia, specifically Korea, Japan, and India. One Japanese netizen noted that during the 1980s, the term "Christmas cakes" was commonly used to refer to women who were unmarried and beyond the national age average of married women. The "actual reference to Christmas cakes is the saying, "who wants Christmas cakes after December 25". A newer term has since supplanted this one, referring to unmarried women as "unsold goods" (urenokori, 売れ残り). Another contributor wrote, similarly, that "a class of highly educated, independent age 27+ women who choose to live a more liberated life and put their talent/skill to good use in society" is happening in India. "People must make their own choices and must simply refuse others' labels and be blissfully happy", she further explained. Alternatively, for men in Japan, the term "herbivore men" is used to describe men who have no interest in getting married or finding a girlfriend.

The China Daily posted the question, "Are 'leftover women' a unique Chinese phenomenon?" in their opinions column. Readers cited their own experiences, stating they too felt societal and family pressures in their thirties and forties for marriage. Yong Cai, who studies China's gender imbalance at the University of North Carolina, stated, "The 'sheng nu' phenomenon is similar to trends we've already seen around the world, in countries ranging from the United States to Japan as higher education and increased employment give women more autonomy". Cai cites studies that show that women are now breaking the tradition of "mandatory marriage" to have fewer children or marry later in life.

Other typologically similar terms that are still used in the modern lexicon of other countries and cultures show the concept has existed in some cases as far back as the 16th century. The term spinster was used to describe unmarried or single women of a marriageable age. It wasn't until 2004 when the Civil Partnership Act replaced the word spinster with "single" in the relationship history section of marriage certificates in the UK. Subsequently, at the height of the Industrial Revolution, the term surplus women was used to describe the excess of unmarried women in Britain.

Catherinette was a traditional French label for women 25 years old or older who were unmarried by the Feast of Saint Catherine of Alexandria on 25 November. The French idiom "to do St. Catherine's hair", meaning "to remain an old maid", is also associated with this tradition.

In Russia, marriage is a substantial part of the national culture, with 30 years being the age at which a woman is considered an "old maid".

== See also ==
- Chinese marriage
- Feminism
- Gender inequality in China
- Marriage in modern China
- Sexuality in China
- Women in China
