= Double standard of aging =

Different standards of aging for females and males, in group and single settings

The double standard of aging, refers to when someone, typically a woman, is held to a higher standard than a similarly aged person, typically a man, with respect to aging. It is most commonly applied to females in the 35-55 age range.

When judging a person with nobody around, both males and females will judge differently from when judging that same person in a group setting. The physical changes that women undergo through the process of aging affects how they are perceived more strongly than the changes that men experience.

== Empirical support ==
As illustrated in a Berman, O'Nan and Floyd study, a female is likely to be judged higher in a private social setting by both males and females than she would in a group social setting. Once the social setting became a group, the women were rated consistently lower, in terms of attractiveness, when compared to men middle-aged and younger, than they were when in a private setting.

In a separate study conducted by Deutisch, Zalenski and Clark, a double standard of aging was evidenced in all represented age groups. It was determined that both males and females were judged lower in attractiveness as they aged; however, the difference in ratings of attractiveness due to age was much greater for women than for men. This study also found a difference in judgement in terms of masculinity and femininity. For men as they aged their attractiveness was judged as decreasing slightly and when judged based on masculinity there was no change. The women in the other hand were judged far less attractive with age as well as being less feminine.
