= List of common nouns derived from ethnic group names =

This is a list of common nouns, used in the English language, whose etymology goes back to the name of some, often historical or archaic, ethnic or religious group, but whose current meaning has lost that connotation and does not imply any actual ethnicity or religion.

Several of these terms are derogatory or insulting. Such entries on this list should not be confused with "ethnic slurs" referring to a person's actual ethnicity, which have a separate list.

== List ==
Apache
A Parisian gangster or thug (from the collective name Apache for several nations of Native Americans).

Bohemian
A person with an unconventional artistic lifestyle (originally meaning an inhabitant of Bohemia; the secondary meaning may derive from an erroneous idea that the Romani people originate from Bohemia). Not used as an insult in most circumstances.

Bugger
Synonymous with sodomite. From Middle English bougre, heretic, from Anglo-French bugre, from Medieval Latin Bulgarus, literally, Bulgarian; (from the association of Bulgaria with the Bogomils, who were accused of heresy and sodomy). Bugger up is a phrase meaning to ruin or spoil something in British English, and it is also used in some English-derived creoles like Tok Pisin (bagarap)

Cannibal
A human who consumes human flesh (originally meaning Carib, thought to be cannibals).

Cohee
(U.S.) Originally (mid-18th century) a Scots-Irish settler into the Virginia Piedmont; later (late 18th century) a backwoodsman, hick, or most severely "poor white trash", especially on the frontier or in the Appalachian area. Post Civil War: a self-referential indicating an independent backwoods small farmer in the West Virginia/Carolina/Tennessee/Kentucky area.

Goth
A crude person, lacking culture or refinement; an obsolete term, originally from the East Germanic tribe of Goths that sacked Rome in 410. The term Gothic for high medieval architecture was originally a pejorative term used during the Renaissance for styles considered archaic and barbaric. A separate sense refers to members of the current Goth subculture.

Gringo
A foreigner; especially used disparagingly against North Americans and Europeans in Latin America. (Possibly from the Spanish word griego, meaning Greek. In Roman days, foreigners were usually divided into Greeks and Barbarians. The use of the term Greek for something foreign or unintelligible can also be seen in the expression "it's Greek to me".) Another theory is that during the Mexican-American War (1846-1848), the American army wore green uniforms, so Mexicans would yell at them “green go home” and later shortened it to “green go” (phonetically similar).

Gyp
A swindler; a racehorse owner; in Britain also a male servant at a college—from Gypsy, which in turn is derived from Egyptian.

Hun
Barbarous or destructive person; also in used in World War I (and to a lesser extend World War II) as an ethnic slur for the Germans. From the confederation of Eurasian tribes that first appeared in Europe in the 4th century, leading to mass migrations of Germanic tribes westward, and which established an empire extending into Europe in the 5th century, known for plundering wealthy Roman cities. In modern Scotland and Northern Ireland the term is a derogatory reference to a Protestant, or a supporter of a historically Protestant football club, most notably Rangers F.C.

Mongol (or Mongoloid)
An obsolete term for people with Down syndrome, which was originally medically classified as "Mongoloid Idiocy". The shorthand version "mong" is also used as an insult.

Philistine
A person indifferent or hostile to artistic and cultural values. From a people that inhabited Canaan when the Israelites arrived, according to the biblical account.

Podunk
An insignificant town. Derived from the exonym of an Algonquin people living in what is now Connecticut.

Pygmy (or Pigmy)
A person of short stature (possibly in reference to certain hunter-gatherer peoples, such as the Mbuti of Central Africa, sometimes grouped together under the term Pygmies, but that designation actually stems from the original meaning of pygmy as an unusually small person).

Samaritan
A generous or helpful person. From the Biblical story of the Good Samaritan. Samaritans are an ethnoreligious group centered in the Levant and their religion is related closely to Judaism.

Sherpa
An expert guide through difficult circumstances. From the Sherpa people, a Nepalese ethnic group, who serve as guides and porters in the Himalayas. Used for the personal representative of a head of state or government who prepares an international summit, particularly the annual G8 Summit.

Tartar
A violently ferocious person, a rather obsolete term, from the nomadic Tatars who participated in the 13th century Mongol invasion of Europe, later generalized to any Mongolian or Turkic invaders of Europe.

Vandal
A person who willfully and maliciously destroys property, from the East Germanic tribe that sacked Rome in 455.

== See also ==
- Lists of pejorative terms for people
