= Guang gun =

Chinese slang term

Guang gun (Chinese: 光棍; Pinyin: guānggùn, lit. 'bare branches' or 'bare sticks') is a popular term used to describe single individuals in Chinese culture. It is also translated less literally as "leftover men". During the Ming dynasty, the term "bare sticks" was used to describe male individuals who participated in illegal activities ranging from robberies to prostitution. The Ming Code, one of the most important codes written in Chinese history in order to regulate society, "specifically labeled bare sticks: demobilized soldiers, the homeless, and other marginalized people 'not engaged in honest work'". The Chinese media has constructed the myth of protest masculinity that single unmarried men might threaten social harmony due to their inability to get married and further the family lineage.

Nowadays, its usage has changed to describe single men, and has even become a derogatory label for single men who are unable to wed and thus unable to contribute to the 'branches' of the family tree or lineage. An equivalent term used to classify women who are unwed by their late twenties or older is sheng nü (Chinese: 剩女; Pinyin: shèng nǚ; common translation: 'leftover women'), popularized by the All-China Women's Federation.

== Context ==
At the height of China's Sex Ratio imbalance in 2011, there were 118 male births to 100 female births. A census published in 2017 by Our World in Data shows Sex Ratio imbalances in major Asian countries such as China, whose numbers far surpass that of its surrounding countries. The ratio of China was that of 115 male births to 100 female births, surpassing that of India, with 111 male births to 100 female births. In 2005, it was calculated that the number of Chinese male individuals under the age of 20 years old was 32 million more than female individuals. This phenomenon came as a result of the implementation of the one-child policy, enforced in 1979. This policy, coupled with the introduction of ultrasound technology into Asian countries in the 1980s began the problem of 'excess males' in the Chinese population. Ultrasound technology was soon employed as a means to predetermine the sex of the fetus, thus began the tendency of sex-selective abortions.

=== Culture ===
The tradition to wed and settle down at a young age is no different in China than in other countries. The lack of potential female suitors coupled with familial pressure leads to individuals 'renting' significant others to bring to social gatherings and celebrations. During important celebrations such as Chinese Lunar New Year, the prices in the 'rental partners' may triple in price. Depending on contracts, these services may include sexual favours, emotional support, temporary relationships, and can even go as far as 'sham' marriages and relationships. In Chinese culture, as in many other cultures in the world, a male heir is sought after, as they are able to extend the family lineage, accumulate more wealth than their female counterparts, as well as care for parents in their declining years.

== Bride price ==
The bride price, commonly referred to as a dowry is a gift of money or goods given to the family of the bride by the groom or his family. With the outnumbering of women by men, the potential to find a wife is limited. The shortage of women has caused the bride price to continually rise since the 1980s, just as the introduction of ultrasound technology induced the tendency of sex-selective abortions. Men of average to lower socio-economic status have a hard time navigating the cycle of patriarchal tradition and capitalism, as they are unable to accumulate enough wealth to pay a higher Bride Price or a dowry. One of the consequences of the gender imbalance is that women of lower socio-economic status are likely to marry up the socio-economic ladder, whereas men of higher socio-economic status tend to marry down. At the bottom of the socio-economic ladder, poor and single men are unable to find potential partners, perpetuating the excess of single men. Men in impoverished rural towns and villages are the ones most affected by the increase in dowry value, as in most villages, the soaring bride prices are not a reflection of the local economic status. Already unable to pay the exorbitant price, these men have no choice but to remain bachelors. Oftentimes, families need to save for decades in order give monetary support to their son; going as far as to take out loans, borrow money from relatives, or even obtain funds illegally. The desperation of the bare branches to find a mate, coupled with bad economic conditions have led to unconventional marriages such as child brides, the abduction of wives, human trafficking, as well as polyandry.

The cycle of rising bride prices and men of low economic status unable to afford such prices causes these poor 'bare branches' to become poorer, as many see no need in earning wages if not to provide for their potential family. These individuals may veer down a rabbit-hole of feeling depressed and discriminated against, thus resulting in drinking, smoking, gambling, etc. In the event of this happening, these bare branches become a burden to their family, as they have to be taken care of. Bare branches who put off marriage, in order to earn and save more money, suffer the fate of marrying at an older age. Like the Sheng nu, men after a certain age are deemed less desirable, and will be required to pay an even higher bride price.

== Abnormal sex ratios ==
Without human interference, sex ratios at birth (number of male births to number of female births) across the world are generally consistent. With the introduction of ultrasound technology in the 1980s and the access of sex-selective abortions, male births have been seen to exceed female births in multiple countries in which the tradition of partiality to a son is still prevalent.

Abnormal sex ratios can be broken down into two categories; sex ratio at birth (number of male births for every 100 female births) and sex ratio in population (number of males for every 100 females in the population). The Sex Ratio at birth can, oftentimes, be inaccurate as it is difficult to acquire information for the correct number of unwanted, abandoned or unrecorded births. In China, the Sex Ratio at birth is inaccurate as some newborns go unrecorded if and when parents violate the one or two-child policy of the government. Although the male ratio at birth is recorded to be higher than that of the female, the female ratio in some populations are recorded to be higher; it is commonly accepted that women have a greater chance at resisting disease and have a longer lifespan.

The preferential treatment of sons and mistreatment of daughters is summarized by Therese Hesketh and Xing Zhu Wei: "son preference is manifest prenatally, through sex determination and sex- selective abortion, and postnatally through neglect and abandonment of female children, which leads to higher female mortality". The high number of males over females in a society not only poses to be a problem, as many individuals are left single and unwed, rather a review written in Trends notes that the more men there are in a society, the more violent the society becomes. This review argues that men are generally more prone to violence. Thus, places in which males are in abundance causes these single and desperate bachelors to compete against one another to find potential suitors, "leading to the prediction that the sex in abundance competes more intensely for mating opportunities than does the rarer sex".

Consequently, this violence causes more harm to the limited number of women than to the men themselves, as during the 1980s, researches linked the large amounts of violence within certain Asian communities to the abnormally male-elevated Sex Ratios in these countries. Research showed that several Indian states and districts, in which there was a largely male-biased Sex Ratio, the murder rates were perceived to be especially high. A paper published in PNAS notes that "when single young men congregate, the potential for more organized aggression is likely to increase substantially." Consequently, many women and female children have gone missing as a result of femicide.

== Criticism ==
The one-child policy, put into motion in 1980, was a controversial political subject of debate that lasted for more than six months. This policy was deemed unenforceable in rural areas. The Chinese countryside was mainly composed of agrarian societies in which manual labourers were crucial contributors. The imposing of this policy in such areas led to many female children being abandoned or aborted, as they were deemed less capable of contributing than male offspring. When the government noticed the number of 'missing' and unreported female children, rural families whose firstborn was female were allowed to give birth to another. In certain clustered areas in rural China, at its most problematic, the sex ratio was up to 150 to 197.2 male children in 100 female children.

When the Chinese government eventually brought into light the severity of the abnormal sex ratio in 1993, they turned to mass propaganda to heavily promote gender equality and "crack[ed] down on medical workers who engage in illegal sex determination and sex-selective abortion for non-medical reasons".

Despite the efforts of the Chinese government to promote the protection of women and children, no effort is aimed at addressing the "problems of men, in particular, the men who cannot find brides", regarding Chinese men as "less worthy of humanitarian care or support and concern".

== In the media ==
Jie Hao's 2010 feature film 光棍儿 Guangguner (Single Man) depicts the lives of several middle-aged bachelors living in a rural village outside of Beijing.
