= Giaour =

Non-Muslim person (of the Ottoman Empire)

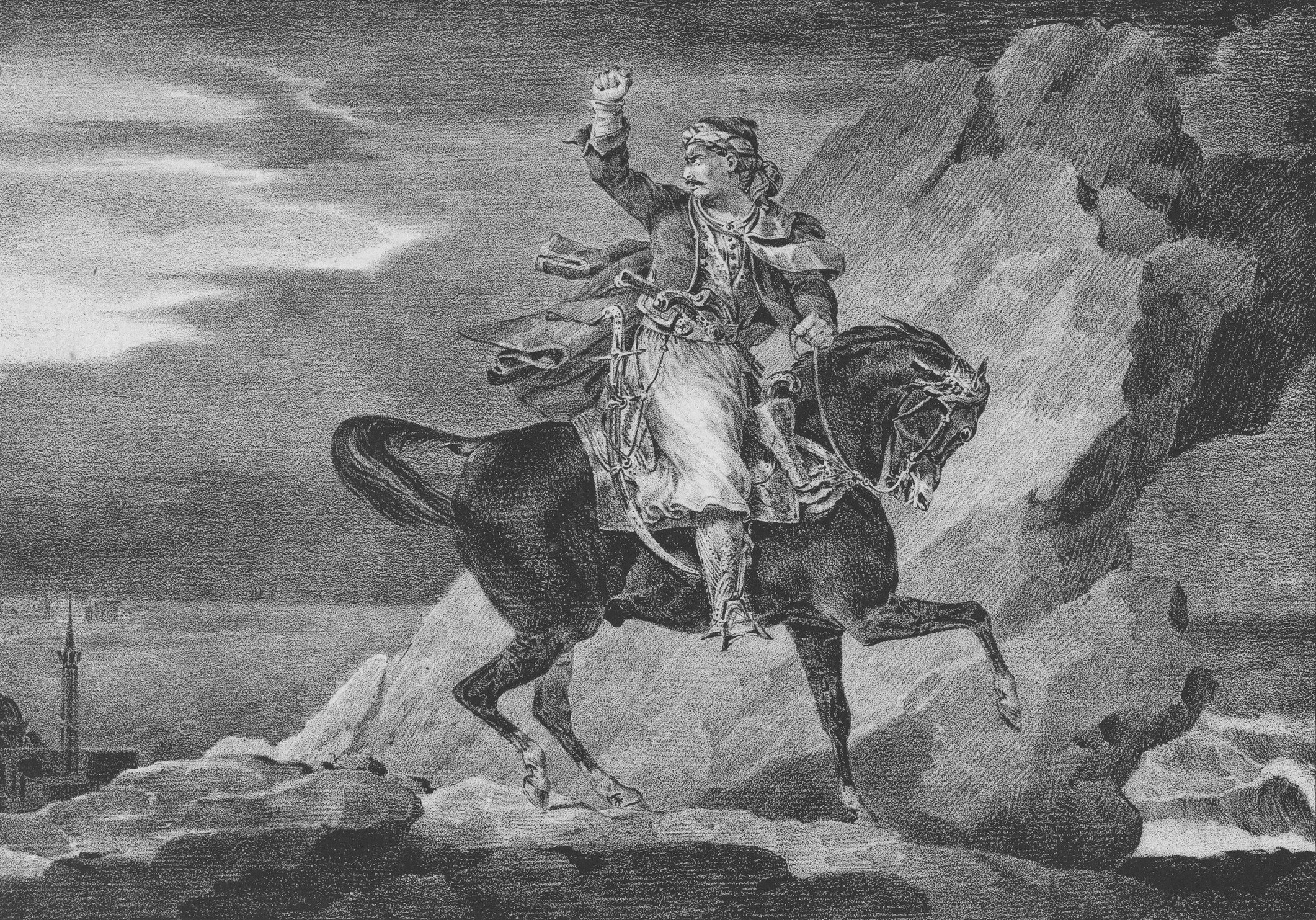
Théodore Géricault: The Giaour (1820, lithograph; Metropolitan Museum of Art, New York)

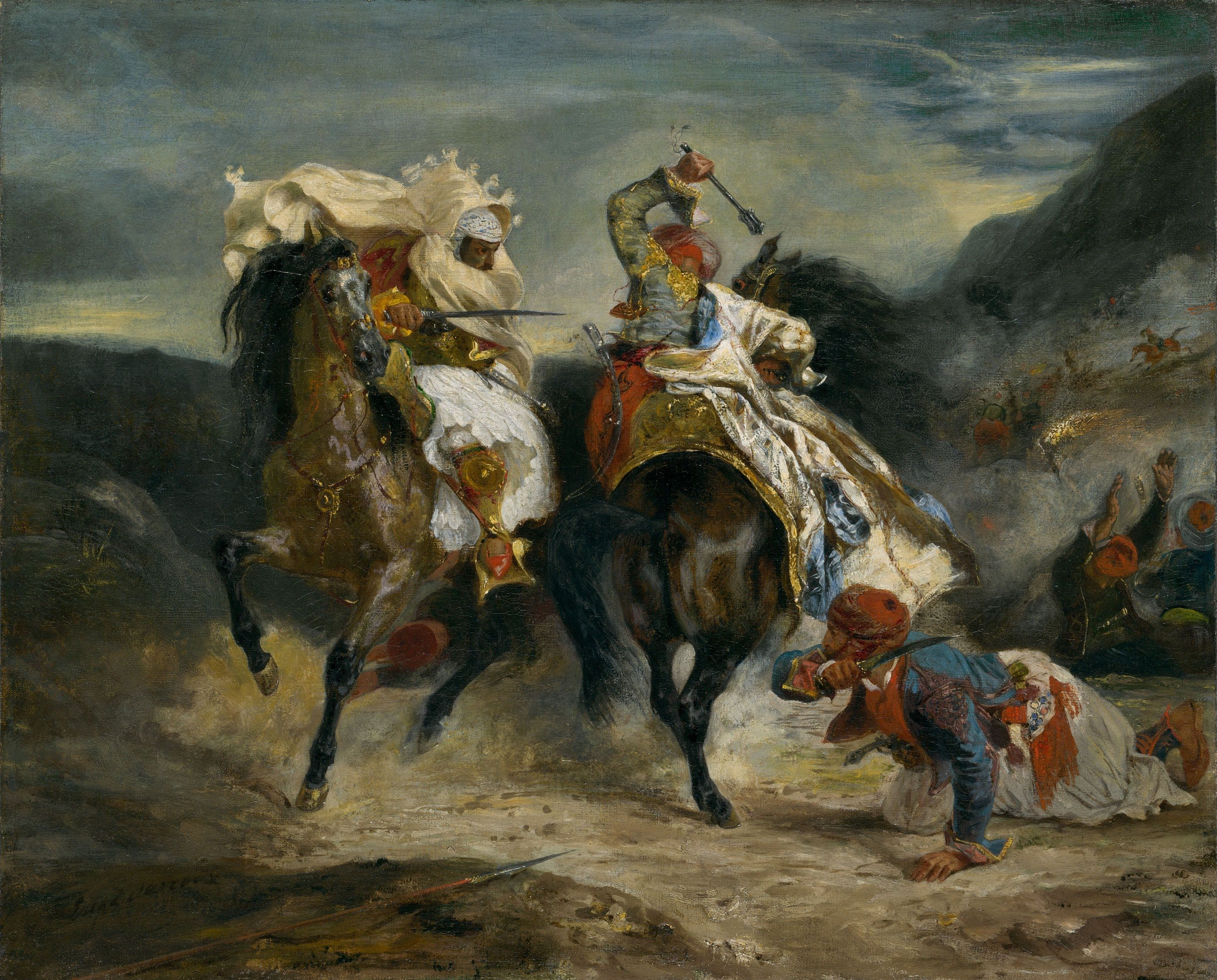
Eugène Delacroix: The Combat of the Giaour and Hassan (1826, oil on canvas; Art Institute of Chicago), inspired by Lord Byron's The Giaour

Giaour or Gawur or Gavour (/ˈdʒaʊər/; Turkish: gâvur, Turkish pronunciation: [ɟaˈvuɾ]; from Ottoman Turkish and Persian: گور gâvor; (Note: an obsolete variant of modern گبر gaur, originally derived from Imperial Aramaic: 𐡂𐡁𐡓𐡀, romanized: gaḇrā, lit. 'man; person') Romanian: ghiaur; Albanian: kaur; Greek: γκιαούρης, romanized: gkiaoúris; Bulgarian: гяур; Bosnian: kaur/đaur; Adyghe: джаур) meaning 'infidel', is a slur used mostly in the lands of the former Ottoman Empire for non-Muslims or, more particularly, Christians in the Balkans.

== Terminology ==
The terms kafir, gawur, and rûm (the last meaning 'Rum millet') were commonly used in defters (tax registries) for Orthodox Christians, usually without ethnic distinction. Christian ethnic groups in the Ottoman Balkans included Greeks (rûm), Bulgarians (bulgar), Serbs (sırp), Albanians (arnavut) and Vlachs (eflak), among others.

The 1911 Encyclopædia Britannica described the term as follows:

Giaour (a Turkish adaptation of the Persian gâwr or gōr, an infidel), a word used by the Turks to describe all who are not Mohammedans, with especial reference to Christians. The word, first employed as a term of contempt and reproach, has become so general that in most cases no insult is intended in its use; for example in parts of China, the term foreign devil has become void of offence. A strict analogy to giaour is found in the Arabic kafir, or unbeliever, which is so commonly in use as to have become the proper name of peoples and countries.

During the Tanzimat (1839–1876) era, a hatt-i humayun prohibited the use of the term by Muslims with reference to non-Muslims to prevent problems occurring in social relationships.

== Use in contemporary Turkish society ==
The term continues to be used in Turkey as a derogatory expression for non-Muslims, particularly Christians. In a 2017 study, researchers Arus Yumul and Ezgi Kan documented its use in Turkish media and everyday discourse to associate non-Muslims with cruelty, hostility and other negative characteristics, contributing to their stigmatization and social exclusion. Political sociologist Pierre Hecker also notes that it can also be directed against Muslims accused of deviating from accepted religious norms, which he discusses in the context of Sunni Muslim cultural dominance. Contemporary examples include its use by President Recep Tayyip Erdoğan in a 2021 speech, criticized by parliamentarian Garo Paylan as hate speech, and by Islamic preacher Ahmet Mahmut Ünlü.

== European cultural references ==
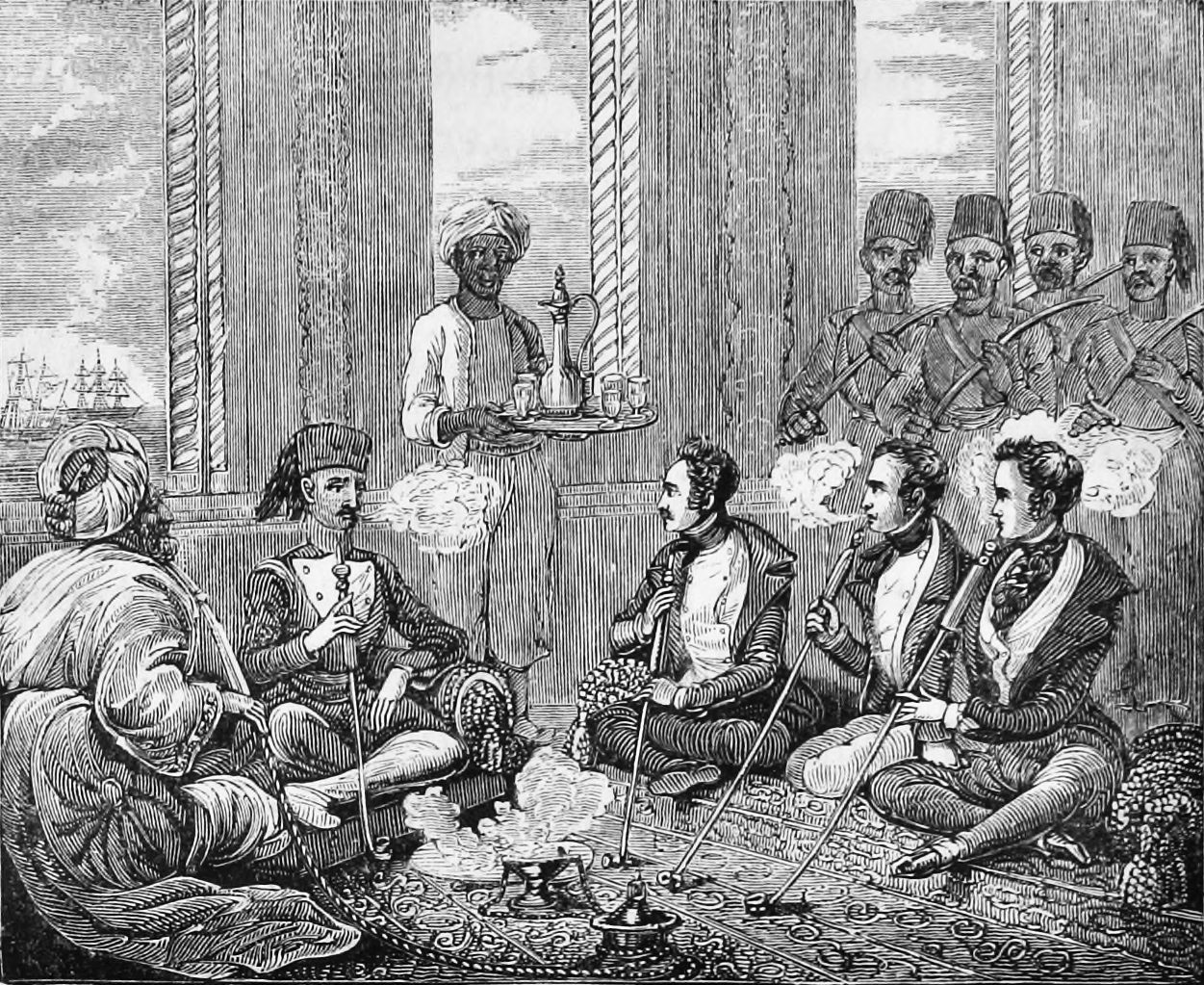
Giaours smoking the tchibouque with the pacha of the Dardanelles, book illustration from 1839.

- Giaour is the name given to the evil monster of a man in the tale Vathek, written by William Beckford in French in 1782 and translated into English soon after. The spelling Giaour appears in the French as well as in the English translation.
- In 1813 Lord Byron published his poem The Giaour: A Fragment of a Turkish Tale, whose themes revolve around the ideas of love, death, and afterlife in Western Europe and the Ottoman Empire.
- Le Giaour, an 1832 painting by Ary Scheffer, oil on canvas, "Musée de la Vie romantique", Hôtel Scheffer-Renan, Paris.
- Sonnet XL of Sonnets from the Portuguese (1850) by Elizabeth Barrett Browning contains these lines:

Musselmans and Giaours
Throw kerchiefs at a smile, and have no ruth
For any weeping.

== See also ==
- Xenophobia and discrimination in Turkey
- Gabr, Persian term, from which "Giaour" is derived
- Kafir, Arabic equivalent
- Ajam
- Dhimmi
- Barbarian
- Farang
  - Frangistan
- Rum (endonym)
  - Rumelia
- Rayah
- Guiri is Spanish slang for a foreign tourist. According to Juan Goytisolo, it is derived from Turkish gâvur.
- Epithets, exonyms, and other names for Muslim groups in the Ottoman Balkans:
  - Arnaut
    - Turco-Albanian
  - Çıtak
  - Vallahades
  - Muslims (ethnic group)
  - Turk (term for Muslims)
