= Spinster =

Unmarried woman, often older

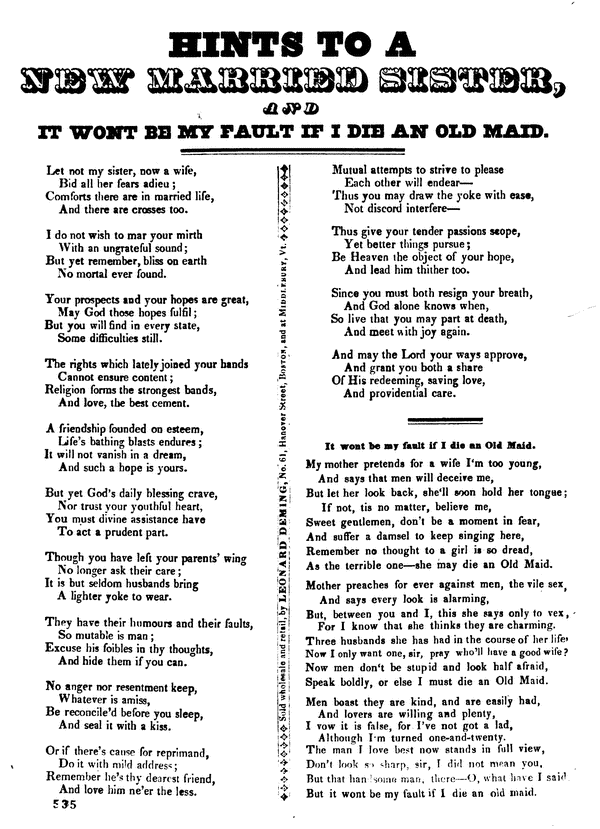
A poem entitled "It won't be my fault if I die an Old Maid", containing the lines "Remember no thought to a girl is so dread / As the terrible one—She may die an Old Maid."

Spinster or old maid is a term referring to an unmarried woman who is older than what is perceived as the prime age range during which women usually marry. It can also indicate that a woman is considered unlikely to ever marry. The term originally denoted a woman whose occupation was to spin. The closest equivalent term for males is "bachelor" or "confirmed bachelor" (or, in cases of gay men, "he never married"), but this generally does not carry the same connotations in reference to age and perceived desirability in marriage.

== Etymology and history ==
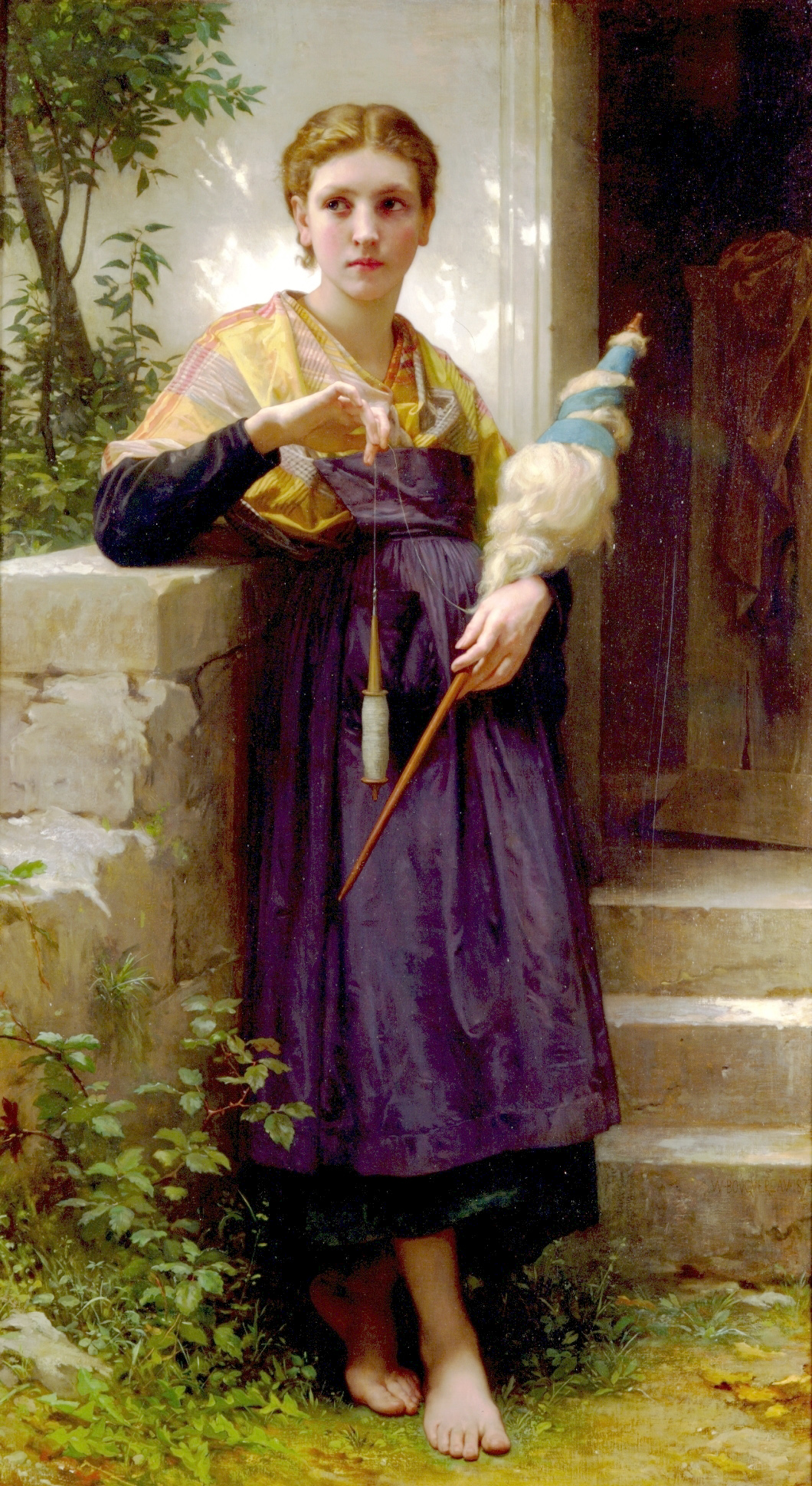
The Spinner by William-Adolphe Bouguereau shows a woman hand-spinning using a drop spindle. Fibers to be spun are bound to a distaff held in her left hand.

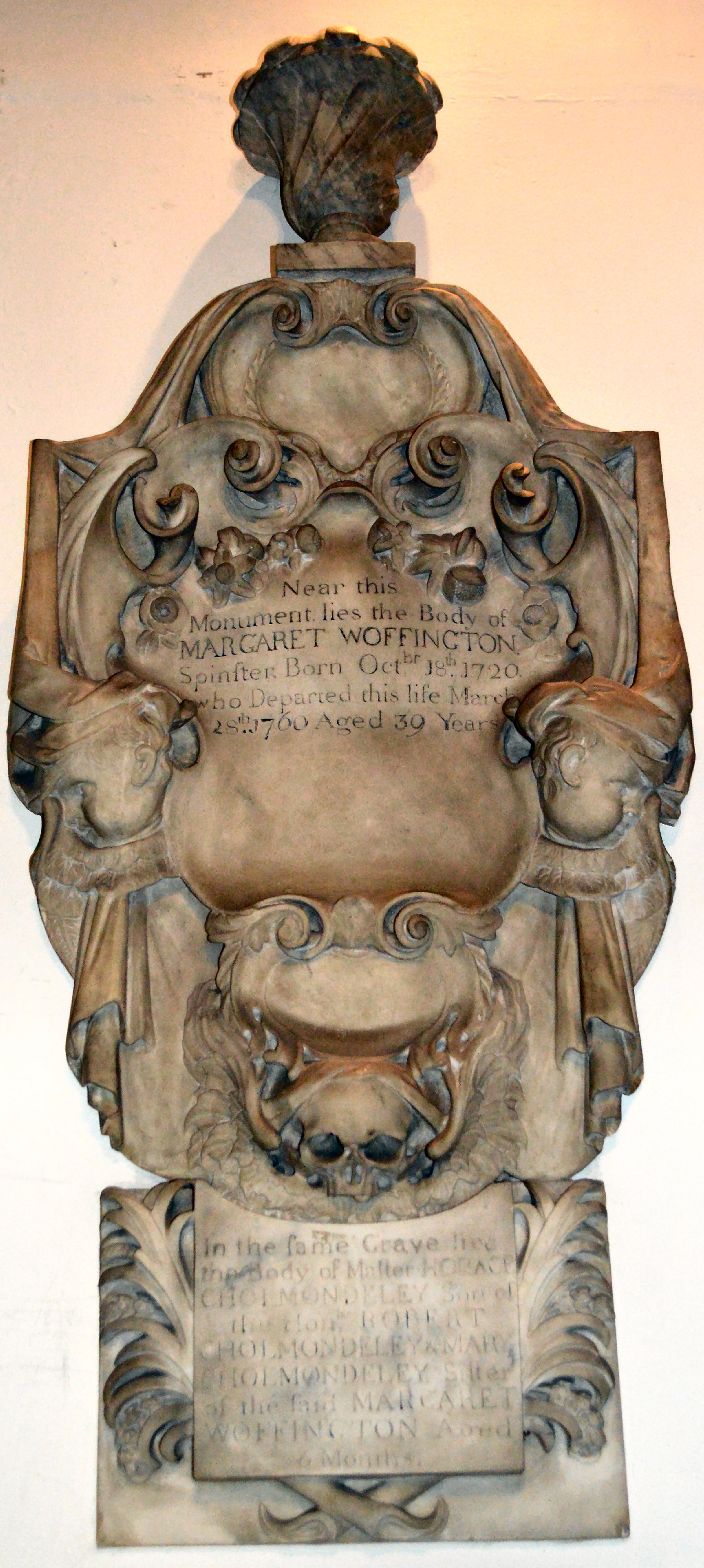
Monument to Peg Woffington (1720–1760) in St Mary's church, Teddington which describes her marital status

Long before the Industrial Age, "the art and calling of being a spinster" denoted girls and women who spun wool. According to the Online Etymological Dictionary, spinning was "commonly done by unmarried women, hence the word came to denote" an unmarried woman in legal documents from the 1600s to the early 1900s, and "by 1719 was being used generically for 'woman still unmarried and beyond the usual age for it". As a denotation for unmarried women in a legal context, the term dates back to at least 1699, and was commonly used in banns of marriage of the Church of England where the prospective bride was described as a "spinster of this parish".

The Oxford American Dictionary tags "spinster" (meaning "...unmarried woman, typically an older woman beyond the usual age for marriage") as "derogatory" and "a good example of the way in which a word acquires strong connotations to the extent that it can no longer be used in a neutral sense."

The 1828 and 1913 editions of Merriam Webster's Dictionary defined spinster in two ways:

1. A woman who spins, or whose occupation is to spin.
2. Law: An unmarried or single woman.

By the 1800s, the term had evolved to include women who chose not to marry. During that century middle-class spinsters, as well as their married peers, took ideals of love and marriage very seriously, and spinsterhood was indeed often a consequence of their adherence to those ideals. They remained unmarried not because of individual shortcomings but because they didn't find a man "who could be all things to the heart".

One 19th-century editorial in the fashion publication Peterson's Magazine encouraged women to remain choosy in selecting a mate — even at the price of never marrying. The editorial, titled "Honorable Often to Be an Old Maid", advised women: "Marry for a home! Marry to escape the ridicule of being called an old maid? How dare you, then, pervert the most sacred institution of the Almighty, by becoming the wife of a man for whom you can feel no emotions of love, or respect even?"

== Current use ==
The Oxford American English Dictionary defines spinster as "an unmarried woman, typically an older woman beyond the usual age for marriage". It adds: "In modern everyday English, however, spinster cannot be used to mean simply 'unmarried woman'; as such, it is a derogatory term, referring or alluding to a stereotype of an older woman who is unmarried, childless, prissy, and repressed."

Currently, Merriam-Webster's Dictionary defines the "unmarried woman" sense of the term in three ways: (1) an archaic usage meaning "an unmarried woman of gentle family", (2) a meaning related to (1) but not tagged as archaic: "an unmarried woman and especially one past the common age for marrying" and (3) "a woman who seems unlikely to marry".

Dictionary.com describes the "woman still unmarried beyond the usual age of marrying" sense of the term as "Disparaging and Offensive". A usage note goes on to say that this sense "is ... perceived as insulting. It implies negative qualities such as being fussy or undesirable". Also included is a sense of the word used specifically in a legal context: "a woman who has never married".

Wordreference.com describes the "woman still unmarried" sense of spinster as "dated".

Age is a crucial part of the definition, according to Robin Lakoff's explanation in Language and Woman's Place: "If someone is a spinster, by implication she is not eligible [to marry]; she has had her chance, and been passed by. Hence, a girl of twenty cannot be properly called a spinster: she still has a chance to be married". Yet other sources on terms describing a never-married woman indicate that the term applies to a woman as soon as she is of legal age or age of majority (see bachelorette, single).

The title "spinster" has been embraced by feminists like Sheila Jeffreys, whose book The Spinster and Her Enemies (1985) defines spinsters simply as women who have chosen to reject sexual relationships with men. In her 2015 book, Spinster, Making a Life of One's Own, Kate Bolick has written, "To me, the spinster is self-reliant and inscrutable. We think we know what the wife is up to and what the mother is up to but the single woman is mysterious. I like that mystery. So the term is a useful way to hold onto the idea of autonomy that can get so easily lost inside of marriage or motherhood".

In 2005, in England and Wales, the term was abolished in favour of "single" for the purpose of marriage registration. However, it is still often used when the banns of marriage are read by Church of England parish churches.

In the journal Critical Studies in Television, Lauren Jade Thompson proposes that one of the male characters in How I Met Your Mother is portrayed as a spinster, rather than as a bachelor.

== Research ==
A 2009 University of Missouri study of 32 women found that modern "spinsters" feel a social stigma attached to their status and a sense of both heightened visibility and invisibility. "Heightened visibility came from feelings of exposure and invisibility came from assumptions made by others".

== Women and marriage ==
Women may not have married for a variety (and/or combination) of reasons, including personal inclination, a dearth of eligible men (whose numbers can decrease dramatically during war conflicts), and socio-economic conditions (that is, the availability of livelihoods for women). Writer and spinster Louisa May Alcott famously wrote that "liberty is a better husband than love to many of us". Social status issues could also arise where it was unacceptable for a woman to marry below her social rank but her parents lacked the funds to support a marriage within their social rank.

In the early 19th century, particularly in common law jurisdictions such as England, married women were subject to coverture, a legal doctrine that all property and contracts in their name are ceded to their husbands. This was particularly common in women who owned businesses. The Married Women's Property Acts of the late 19th century weakened coverture, which was eliminated by later reforms.

The First World War (1914–1918) prevented many within a generation of women from experiencing romance and marriage or having children.

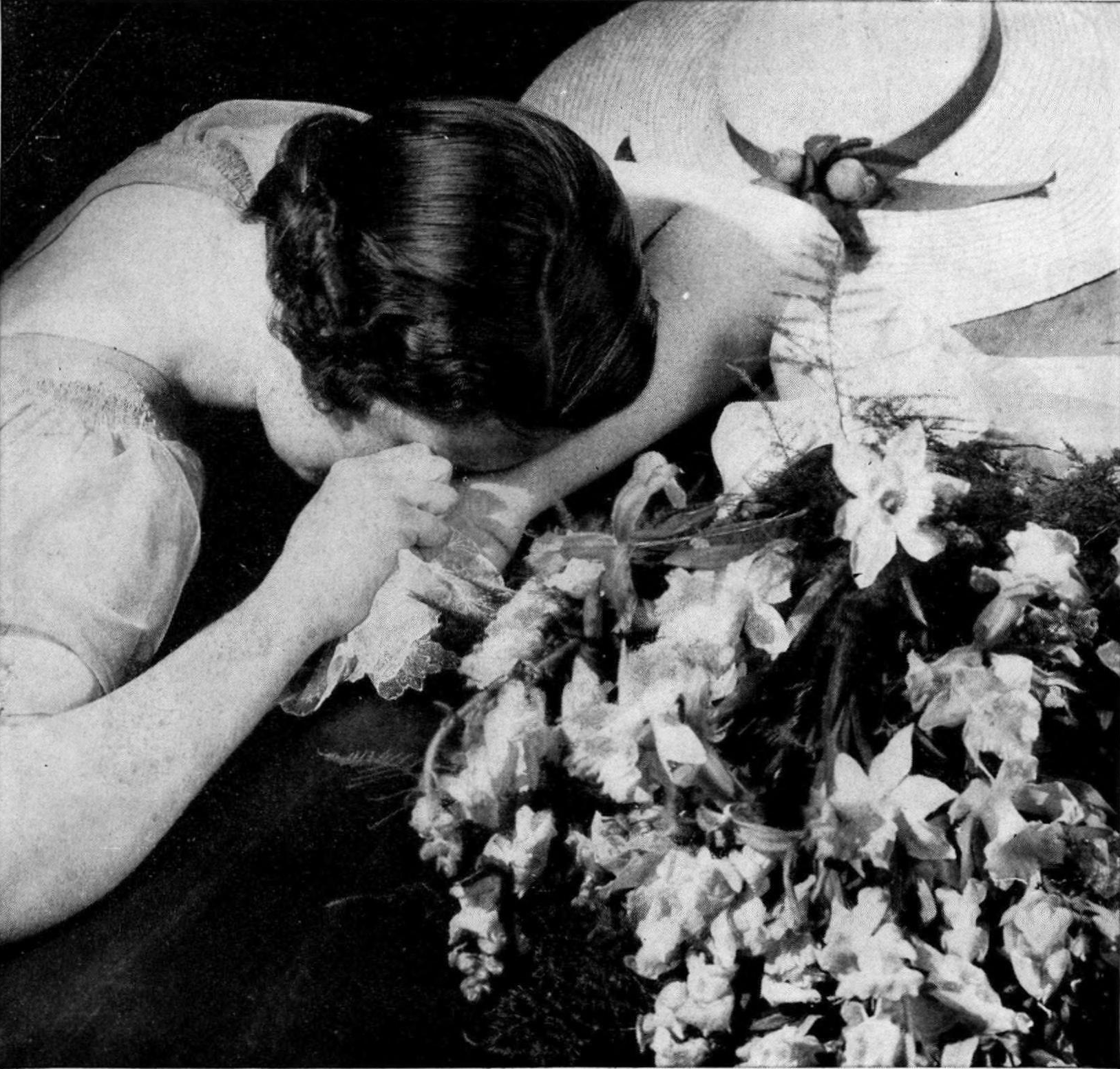
In 1936, Lambert Pharmacal Co., St. Louis, Mo. advertising Listerine mouthwash blamed halitosis for Edna approaching her 30th birthday, and still being "Often a bridesmaid but never a bride".

In modern peacetime societies with wide opportunities for romance, marriage and children, there are other reasons that women remain single as they approach old age. Psychologist Erik Erikson postulated that during young adulthood (ages 18 to 39), individuals experience an inner conflict between a desire for intimacy (i.e., a committed relationship leading to marriage) and a desire for isolation (i.e., fear of commitment). Other reasons women may choose not to marry include a focus on career, a desire for an independent life, economic considerations, or an unwillingness to make the compromises expected in a marriage.

Some writers have suggested that to understand why women do not marry, one should examine reasons women do marry and why it may be assumed they should marry in the first place. According to Adrienne Rich:

Women have married because it was necessary, in order to survive economically, in order to have children who would not suffer economic deprivation or social ostracism, in order to remain respectable, in order to do what was expected of women, because coming out of ‘abnormal’ childhoods they wanted to feel ‘normal’ and because heterosexual romance has been represented as the great female adventure, duty, and fulfillment

In law, a 'spinster' refers to an unmarried woman who had reached her majority. This was, in part, to reinforce the right to own property outside of marriage.

== See also ==
- Incel
- Catherinette
- Single women in the Middle Ages
- Sheng nu
