= Mabel Barbee Lee =

American writer (1884–1978)

Mabel A. Barbee Lee (1884–1978) was an American writer, teacher at Victor High School, and administrator of Colorado College, the University of California, Berkeley, and other institutions.

== Biography ==
Mabel was born in Silver Reef, Utah, on April 11, 1884, and later grew up in Cripple Creek, Colorado. She attended Colorado College before she started her career as a teacher. She married mining engineer Howard Shields Lee on June 15, 1908 in Denver, and followed him to mining areas across the continent. He died in 1918 during an influenza outbreak and she went on to become dean of women at Colorado College from 1922 to 1929. She then served as administrator at Bennington College, Radcliffe College, Whitman, and the University of California, Berkeley. She then returned to Colorado and visited Cripple Creek in order to write Cripple Creek Days. She wrote a few more books before she died in Santa Barbara, California, on December 12, 1978. There is an archive of her manuscripts in the Western History and Genealogy Department at the Denver Public Library and another, with her correspondence with Lowell Thomas at the Colorado College Library.

In 1930, she wrote an article titled "Censoring the Conduct of College Women" that was published in Atlantic Monthly.

In 1959, she appeared on This Is Your Life as a part of the life of Lowell Thomas, her former Victor High School English student.

She is buried with her parents, Johnson R. Barbee and Katherine "Kitty" Appleby, in Mount Pisgah Cemetery, Cripple Creek, Colorado.

== Published works ==
- Cripple Creek Days, 1958 Foreword by Lowell Thomas
- And Suddenly It's Evening, A Fragment of Life, 1963
- The Rainbow Years, 1966
- Back in Cripple Creek, 1968
- The Gardens in My Life; An Intimate Memoir, 1970

== Awards ==
- 1958: Spur Award for Best Nonfiction, Cripple Creek Days
