= Stanley Porteus =

Australian psychologist and author (1883–1972)

- Born: April 24, 1883; Box Hill, Victoria, Australia
- Died: October 21, 1972 (aged 89); Honolulu, Hawaii, United States
- Scientific career
- Fields: Psychology

Stanley David Porteus (April 24, 1883 – October 21, 1972) was an Australian psychologist and author.

== Early life ==
Porteus was born at Box Hill, Victoria, Australia, a suburb of Melbourne, Victoria. His father was a Methodist minister, and the family moved frequently. He attended the Melbourne Education Institute on a three-year scholarship and completed his studies in 1899. He began teaching, and in 1909 he married Frances Mainwaring Evans. They eventually had two sons together.

== Career ==
=== Teaching in Australia ===
After graduating from the Melbourne Education Institute in 1899 Porteus became an apprentice teacher and taught at small country schools in Gippsland. In 1913 he became the initial head teacher at Victoria's first Education Department sponsored school for feeble-minded children. Having the task of selecting students for his small school, Porteus devised a new intelligence test of his own, the Porteus Maze Test, a non-verbal intelligence test. The test was originally used to identify children in need of special education, though it is still in use today for other purposes.

In 1916, Porteus began research on brain size and intelligence at the University of Melbourne, where he also lectured on experimental education.

=== Vineland Training School ===
In 1919 Porteus was invited to join the Vineland Training School in New Jersey, United States, moving there to replace H. H. Goddard as Director of Research. This invitation came at a good time, as his full-time employment as a head teacher with the Victorian Education Department was souring and although he had no university degree, the new job launched him into a lifelong academic career. He remained at the Vineland school until 1922 and published additional work on brain size and intelligence, the success of his maze test, and the supposed connectedness of intelligence and deviant social behavior.

=== University of Hawaiʻi ===
In 1922 he moved to Hawaii where he founded the Psychological and Psychopathic Clinic at the University of Hawaiʻi, eventually becoming professor of clinical psychology and its director and Dean of the Psychology Department in 1925. He remained Directory of the Psychological and Psychopathic Clinic until 1948.

The author of many papers and books, Porteus also created a racial hierarchy of intelligence using his maze device which he believed was "a valid, culture-free measure of general intelligence--despite the fact that among his South African samples one group that already knew a 'labyrinth game' outscored all neighboring groups that did not know the game". His theories about the superior intelligence of white races has led to recent controversy, including protests by students at the University of Hawaiʻi. Porteus was an early contributor to Mankind Quarterly, helped William Shockley organize the Foundation for Education on Eugenics and Dysgenics, and served on the executive committee of the International Association for the Advancement of Ethnology and Eugenics.

He died in 1972 at Honolulu. His ashes are scattered at sea.

== Porteus Hall ==
The University of Hawaiʻi social sciences building, Porteus Hall, was named after him in 1974. Less than two months later, however, a group of university students and faculty called the Coalition to Rename Porteus Hall mounted a full-scale campaign in opposition to the name. Both the original decision to name the building after him and the opposition to the name centered on his 1926 book Temperament and Race which the university called, "a classic in its field" but which the Coalition denounced as "a flagrantly racist attack on all non-white peoples" and "particularly insulting to the indigenous and non-white immigrant groups who, then as now, make up the overwhelming majority of the population of Hawaiʻi." The university affirmed the name in 1975, but throughout the next two decades it was common for students to refer to the building as "Racism Hall". In 1997 the Associated Students voted unanimously to urge that the building be renamed. In response the President of the university appointed a committee to make recommendations regarding renaming the building. It was renamed Saunders Hall in 2001.

== Selected publications ==
- Temperament and Race (1926)
- Calabashes and Kings (1945)
- The Restless Voyage (1948)
- Providence Ponds: A Novel of Early Australia (1951)

== See also ==
- Race and intelligence controversy
- The Blonde Captive - Film made using footage obtained during Porteus' psychological and psychophysical studies of Aboriginal Australians.
