= Goldfield, Colorado =

Census-designated place in Teller County, CO, USA

- Census-designated place
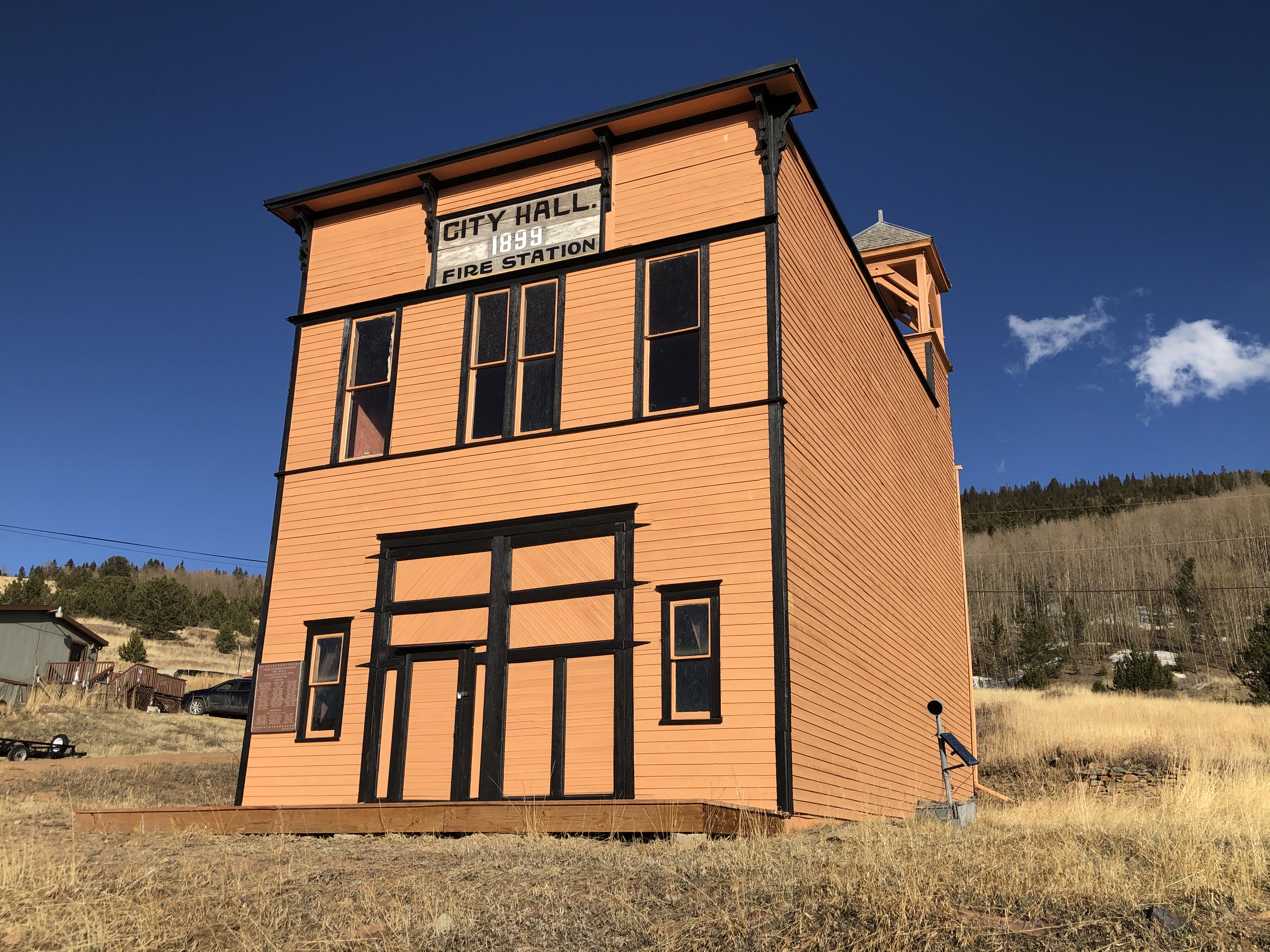
- Goldfield City Hall and Fire Department.

- Flag

- Location of the Goldfield CDP in Teller County, Colorado
- Coordinates: 38°43′06″N 105°07′28″W
- Country: United States
- State: Colorado
- County: Teller County
- Founded: 1895

Government
  - Type: Unincorporated community

Area
  - Total: 0.141 sq mi (0.365 km^{2})
  - Land: 0.141 sq mi (0.365 km^{2})
  - Water: 0 sq mi (0.000 km^{2})
- Elevation: 9,932 ft (3,027 m)

Population (2020)
  - Total: 63
  - Density: 450/sq mi (170/km^{2})
- Time zone: UTC-7 (MST)
  - Summer (DST): UTC-6 (MDT)
- ZIP Code: Cripple Creek 80813
- Area code: 719
- GNIS feature ID: 2583241

Goldfield is an unincorporated community and a census-designated place (CDP) located in and governed by Teller County, Colorado, United States. The CDP is a part of the Colorado Springs, CO Metropolitan Statistical Area. The population of the Goldfield CDP was 63 at the United States Census 2020. The Cripple Creek post office (Zip Code 80813) serves the area.

== History ==
The Goldfield post office operated from May 5, 1895, until June 3, 1932. The community was named for a gold mine near the original town site.

== Geography ==
The Goldfield CDP has an area of 90 acres (0.365 km^{2}), all land.

== Demographics ==
The United States Census Bureau initially defined the Goldfield CDP for the United States Census 2010.

Goldfield CDP, Colorado
| Year | Pop. | ±% |
|---|---|---|
| 2010 | 49 | — |
| 2020 | 63 | +28.6% |
Source: United States Census Bureau

== Education ==
It is in the Cripple Creek-Victor School District RE-1.

== See also ==
- Outline of Colorado
