= Mary Bird (skier) =

American alpine skier (1910–2002)

Mary Elizabeth Bird Young (June 10, 1910 – November 3, 2002) was an American alpine skier who competed at the 1936 Winter Olympics in Garmisch-Partenkirchen. She started, but did not finish, in the women's combined event. She was born in Chicago, Illinois and was a member of the White Mountain Ski Club. Prior to the Olympics she had trained at the Otto Furrer's Ski School in Sankt Anton am Arlberg. After the Olympics she taught at a skiing school in Jackson, New Hampshire before marrying Chris Young, a maker of ski films who worked for Lowell Thomas. Bird makes a cameo appearance as a skier in the film Schlitz on Mt. Washington, which was produced and directed by Young, who also plays the role of Schlitz. She died in Sharon, Connecticut on November 3, 2002.
