= Woodington =

Woodington may refer to:

- Woodington, Ontario, a community in Muskoka Lakes, Ontario, Canada
- Woodington, Hampshire, a United Kingdom location
- Woodington, North Carolina, a township in Lenoir County, North Carolina, United States
- Woodington, Ohio, an unincorporated community in Ohio, United States

== People with the surname ==
- William F. Woodington, English painter and sculptor
