= Adaptive behavior =

Psychological concept

Adaptive behavior refers to the collection and independent performance of the skills that enable an individual to meet the social and practical demands of everyday living, similar to the term life skills. This is a term used in psychology, special education and the law, encompassing various criteria used to determine intellectual and neurodevelopmental disabilities. In contrast, maladaptive behavior refers to acquired behavior that leads to sub-optimal outcomes, negatively impacting everyday life of individuals.

== Specific skills ==
Adaptive behaviors include life skills such as grooming, dressing, safety, food handling, working, money management, cleaning, making friends, social skills, and the personal responsibility expected of their age, social group and wealth group. These skills are typically split into three categories: conceptual, social and practical.

=== Conceptual skills ===
These are those that relate to learning and communication e.g.

1. Counting, Coin summation
2. Managing time
3. Communication (including language usage and non-verbal communication)
4. Reading and writing
5. Understanding the concept of money

=== Social skills ===
Social skills refer to skills involved in interacting with and forming connections with others e.g.

1. Ability to display desired social qualities
2. Integrating oneself in communities
3. Following rules
4. Having good self-esteem
5. Resistance to being manipulated or deceived

=== Practical skills ===
Those involved in performing tasks essential to daily life independently e.g.

1. Walking safely
2. Communication of basic needs
3. Using a phone
4. Oral hygiene and tooth brushing
5. Managing finances

== Origins of adaptive behavior ==
Both an ultimate and promative level of explanation are posited for adaptive behavior. At the ultimate level, it is thought to have evolved through natural selection, with major evolutionary approaches agreeing that humans possess psychological mechanisms that produce adaptive responses to environmental demands. At the proximate level, adaptive behavior depends on intact cognitive processes, with research demonstrating that developmental changes in cognition are positively associated with changes in adaptive behavior in individuals with intellectual disability.

== History of the term ==
The term 'adaptive behavior' emerged in the 1800s in connection to defining intellectual disability (ID). In 1936, Doll developed the first assessment of the construct of adaptive behavior, the Vineland Social Maturity Scale (VSMS), and in 1941 he proposed that the definition of mental disability be revised to include measures of ability in the form of estimates of adaptive behavior, termed social competence.

This resulted in the American Association on Intellectual and Developmental Disabilities (AAIDD), formally including adaptive behavior deficits in their definition of ID in 1959, so that the definition then focused on both intellectual functioning and adaptive behavior, defined in 1961 as:

- The ability of an individual to maintain themselves independently
- The degree to which they meet the culturally imposed demand of personal and social responsibility

The concept of adaptive behavior is now widely used in the classification of intellectual disabilities. It is one of the three criteria that must be met for a formal diagnosis of ID (alongside significant limitations in intellectual functioning and an onset before adulthood), as stated in the Diagnostic and Statistical Manual of Mental Disorders—Fifth Edition (DSM-5).

== Measuring adaptive behavior ==
Adaptive behavior is defined as a measure of how well individuals can live independently. Tools meant to measure adaptive behavior should determine areas of weaknesses, enabling the creation of support plans for affected people.

In the past century, a variety of scales intending to measure adaptive behavior have been developed, building on the VSMS. Some of the most notable ones (many of which have been revised at least once and are still used today) include:

- Vineland Adaptive Behavior Scale (Vineland ABS) (which built directly on the VSMS)
- American Association of Mental Deficiency-Adaptive Behavior Scale (AAMD-ABS)
- Adaptive Behavior Assessment System (ABAS)
- Diagnostic Adaptive Behavior Scale (DABS)

The different scales aim to measure different conceptual, social and practical skills, focusing on different domains depending on their context, target and purpose.

== Problems with assessing long-term and short-term adaptation ==
One problem with assessments of adaptive behavior is that a behavior that appears adaptive in the short run can be maladaptive in the long run and vice versa. For example, in the case of a group with rules that insist on drinking harmful amounts of alcohol both abstinence and moderate drinking (moderate as defined by actual health effects, not by socially constructed rules) may seem maladaptive if assessments are strictly short term, but an assessment that focuses on long-term survival would instead find that it was adaptive and that it was obedience under the drinking rule that was maladaptive. Such differences between short term effects and long-term effects in the context of harmful consequences of short-term compliance with destructive rules are argued by some researchers to show that assessments of adaptive behavior are not independent of social factors.

== The role of education in adaptive behavior ==
Adaptive behaviors can be learned and interventions can help increase the quality of life for those with intellectual disability, since adaptive behavior has been shown to be the main determinant of quality of life for individuals with intellectual disability. It is for this reason that training in adaptive behavior, whilst it is a key component of any educational program, is critically important for children with special needs.

There is, however, significant heterogeneity in terms of what level of adaptive functioning can be achieved by means of therapeutic measures. In addition, investigated studies focus on group-level effects, making it difficult to determine individually tailored strategies. Furthermore, studies have shown that parental attitudes, including an excessive reliance on assistants to perform tasks for their children, can act as significant barriers to teaching adaptive behavior.
