= Lowell Thomas =

American author, broadcaster and traveler (1892–1981)

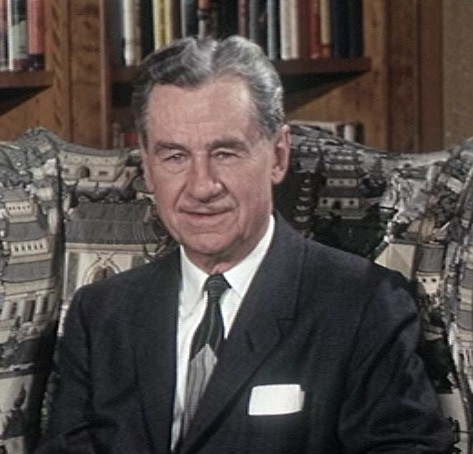
- Lowell Thomas, c. 1966
- Born: Lowell Jackson Thomas; April 6, 1892; Woodington, Ohio, U.S.
- Died: August 29, 1981 (aged 89); Pawling, New York, U.S.
- Education: Valparaiso University; University of Denver; Princeton University
- Occupations: Writer, broadcaster
- Employer: Chicago-Kent College of Law
- Spouses: Frances Ryan (m. 1917; died 1975) Marianna Munn (m. 1977)
- Children: Lowell Thomas Jr.

Lowell Jackson Thomas (April 6, 1892 – August 29, 1981) was an American writer, broadcaster, and documentary filmmaker, known as a world traveler. He authored more than fifty non-fiction books, mostly travel narratives and popular biographies of explorers and military men. Between 1930 and the mid-1970s, Thomas appeared regularly on radio and occasionally on television as a travel and news commentator. Until the 1950s, he was a narrator of Movietone newsreels shown in cinemas.

Thomas was especially known for the writings and documentary films that turned T. E. Lawrence (Lawrence of Arabia) into an international celebrity. Later in his career, Thomas was involved in promoting the Cinerama widescreen system. In 1954, he led a group of New York City-based investors to buy majority control of Hudson Valley Broadcasting, which, in 1957, became Capital Cities Television Corporation.

== Early life ==
Thomas was born in Woodington, Ohio, to Harry and Harriet (née Wagoner) Thomas. His father was a doctor, his mother a teacher. In 1900, the family moved to the mining town of Victor, Colorado. Thomas worked there as a gold miner, a cook, and a reporter on the newspaper.

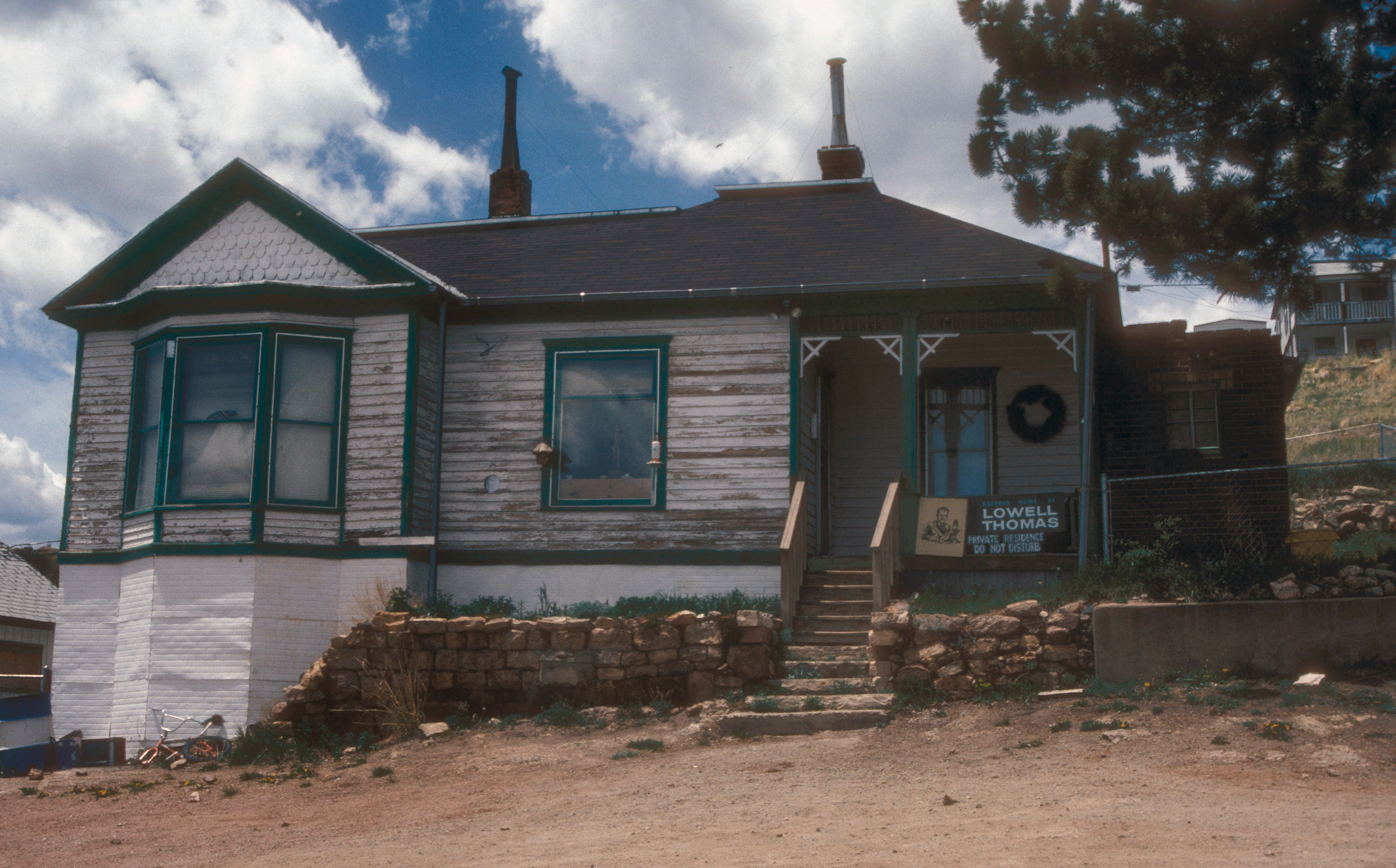
Thomas's boyhood home in Victor, Colorado

In 1911, Thomas graduated from Victor High School where one of his teachers was Mabel Barbee Lee. The following year, he graduated from Valparaiso University with a bachelor of science degree. The next year, he received both a B.A. and an M.A. from the University of Denver and began work for the Chicago Journal, writing for it until 1914. Thomas also was on the faculty of Chicago-Kent College of Law (now part of Illinois Institute of Technology), where he taught oratory from 1912 to 1914. He then went to New Jersey where he studied for a master's at Princeton University (he received the degree in 1916) and again taught oratory at the university.

== Career ==
Thomas became interested in travel as a young man, and his skills for self-promotion helped him to persuade railroads to give him free passage in exchange for articles extolling rail travel. When he visited Alaska in 1914, he took a movie camera with him and became one of the first to use the new medium to make travelogues. After the United States entered World War I, Thomas went to Europe to report on the conflict and from there to Egypt and Palestine, where he met T.E. Lawrence, who was acting as British liaison to the local leaders of the Arab Revolt against the Ottoman Empire.

=== Lawrence of Arabia ===
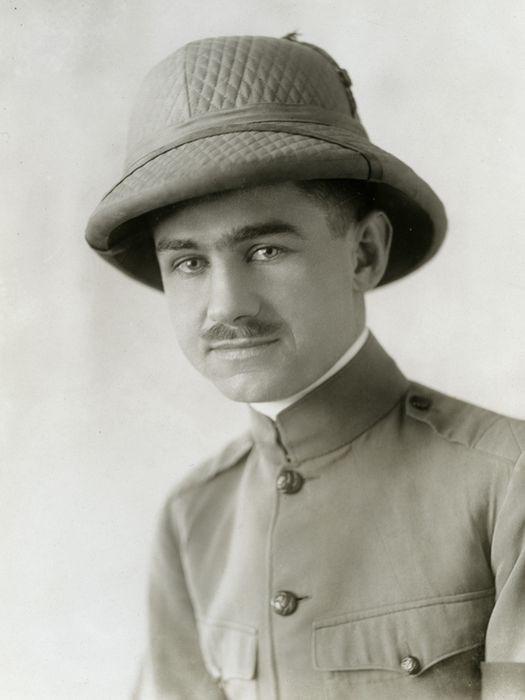
Thomas in Arabia 1918

Thomas shot dramatic footage of Lawrence in Arab dress, then returned to America and began giving public lectures in 1919 on the war in Palestine, "supported by moving pictures of veiled women, Arabs in their picturesque robes, camels and dashing Bedouin cavalry." His lectures were very popular and drew large audiences. He agreed to take the lecture to Britain, but only "if asked by the King and given Drury Lane or Covent Garden" as a lecture venue. His conditions were met, and he opened a series at Covent Garden on August 14, 1919. "And so followed a series of some hundreds of lecture–film shows, attended by the highest in the land". In 1924, Thomas published the memoir With Lawrence in Arabia.

Thomas genuinely admired Lawrence and continued to defend him against later attacks on Lawrence's reputation. Lawrence's brother Arnold allowed Thomas to contribute to T.E. Lawrence by his Friends (1937), a collection of essays and reminiscences published after Lawrence's death.

In the 1962 film Lawrence of Arabia, a fictionalized version of Thomas named Jackson Bentley was portrayed by actor Arthur Kennedy. (Kennedy was in his late-forties when the film was made, although Thomas had been in his mid-twenties at the time of the events.)

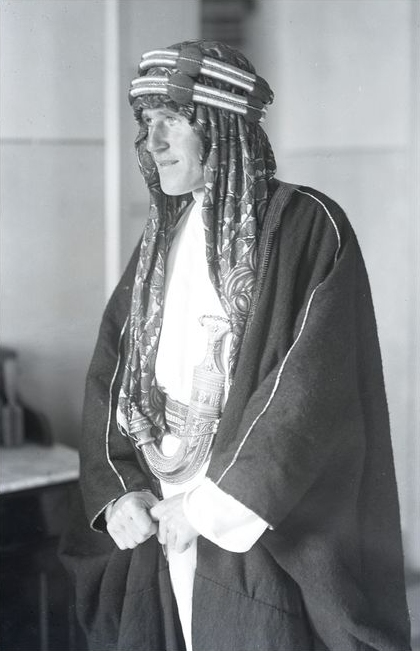
Thomas' first photo of Lawrence, taken in Jerusalem as they were introduced in the office of the Military Governor, February 28, 1918

=== Narration and Cinerama ===
Thomas was a magazine editor during the 1920s, but he never lost his fascination with the movies. He narrated Twentieth Century Fox's twice weekly Movietone newsreels until 1952, and provided the voice-over for numerous short subject film series, including Lowell Thomas' Magic Carpet of Movietone and Going Places with Lowell Thomas.

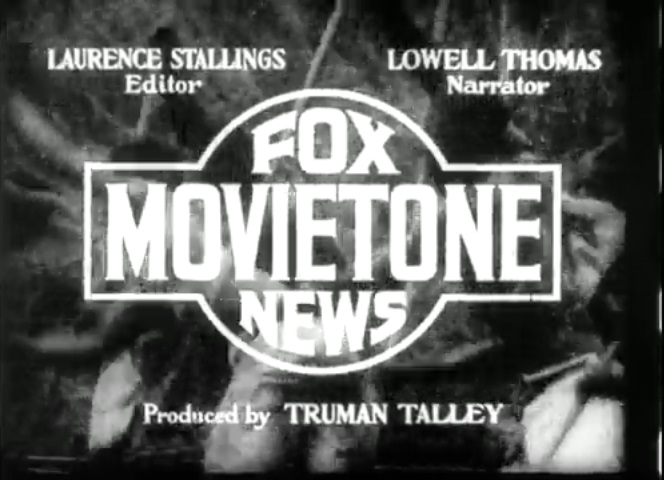
Movietone Title Card

Thomas went into business with Mike Todd and Merian C. Cooper to exploit Cinerama, a film exhibition format using three projectors and an enormous curved screen with seven-channel surround sound. He narrated the Cinerama documentaries This is Cinerama (1952) and Seven Wonders of the World (1956), and both produced and narrated Search for Paradise (1957).

=== Radio commentator and newscaster ===
Thomas was first heard on radio delivering talks about his travels in 1929 and 1930: for example, he spoke on the NBC Radio Network in late July 1930 about his trip to Cuba. Then, in late September 1930, he took over as the host of the Sunday evening Literary Digest program, replacing the previous host, Floyd Gibbons. On the program, he told stories of his travels. The show was fifteen-minutes long, and heard on the NBC Network. Thomas soon changed the focus of the program from his own travels to interesting stories about other people. By October 1930, he was including more news stories. It was at this point that the program, which was now on six days a week, moved to the CBS Radio network.

After two years, he switched back to the NBC Radio network but returned to CBS in 1947. He was not an employee of either NBC or CBS, contrary to today's practices, but was employed by the broadcast's sponsor Sunoco. He returned to CBS to take advantage of lower capital-gains tax rates, establishing an independent company to produce the broadcast which he sold to CBS, like coverage of the Coronation Ice Show in Lake Placid, New York in 1934. He hosted the first television news broadcast in 1939 and the first regularly scheduled television news broadcast beginning on February 21, 1940, over W2XBS (now WNBC) New York, which was a camera simulcast of his radio broadcast.

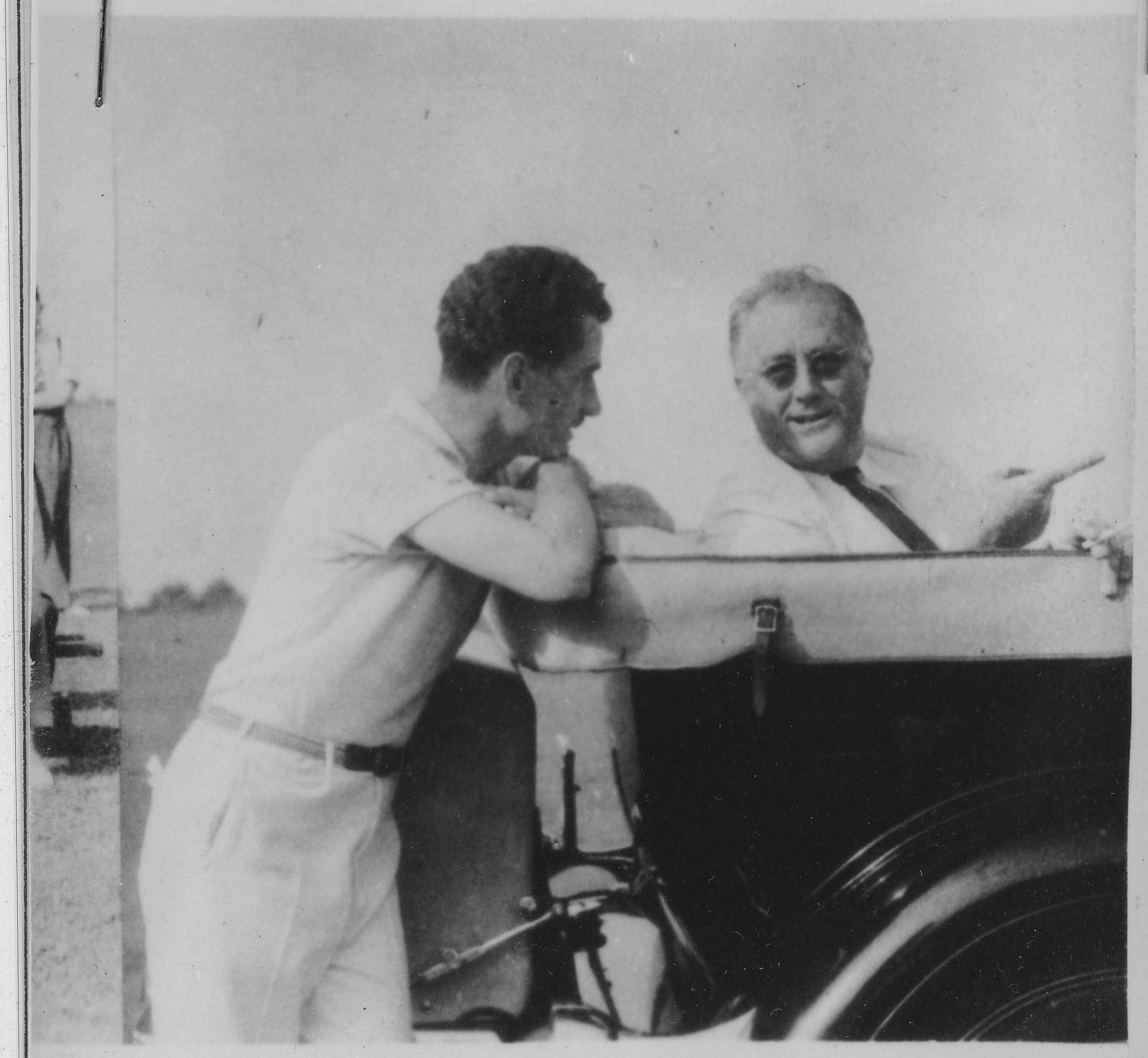
Thomas with FDR in 1936

In the summer of 1940, Thomas anchored a television broadcast of the 1940 Republican National Convention, the first live telecast of a political convention, which was fed from Philadelphia to W2XBS and on to W2XB Schenectady (now WRGB). He was not actually in Philadelphia but was anchoring the broadcast from a New York studio and merely identifying speakers who addressed the convention to the few thousand people who had television sets in those three cities.

In April 1945, Thomas flew in a normally single-person P-51 Mustang over Berlin while it was being attacked by the Soviet Union, reporting live via radio.

In 1953, Thomas was featured in The Ford 50th Anniversary Show that was broadcast simultaneously on the NBC and CBS television networks. The program was viewed by 60 million persons. Thomas presented a tribute to the classic days of radio.

His persistent debt problems were remedied by Thomas' manager/investing partner, Frank Smith who, in 1954, became the President of co-owned Hudson Valley Broadcasting Company, which, in 1957, became Capital Cities Television Corporation.

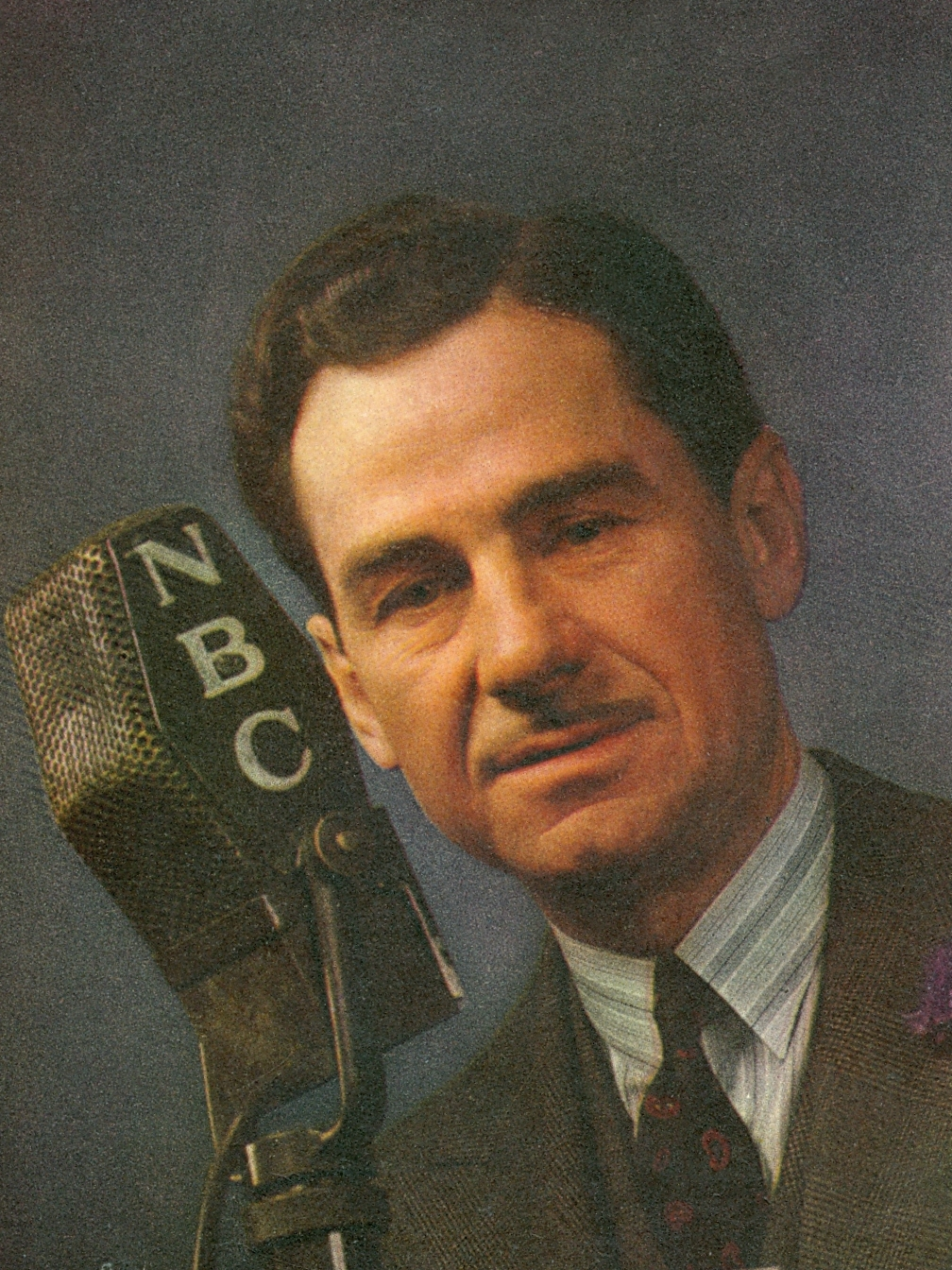
Thomas in 1939

The television news simulcast was a short-lived venture for Thomas, as he favored radio. It was over radio that he presented and commented upon the news for four decades until his retirement in 1976, the longest radio career of anyone in his day, since surpassed by Paul Harvey. His signature sign-on was "Good evening, everybody" and his sign-off was "So long, until tomorrow," phrases that he used as titles for his two volumes of memoirs. After his nightly CBS radio news program ended its run on May 14, 1976, he hosted Lowell Thomas Remembers, a 39-week series produced by the South Carolina Educational Television Network which aired on PBS in 1976 and 1977. It featured Fox Movietone newsreels from the 1920s to the 1950s, with the half-hour installments covering each of the years in that four-decade span.

== Personal life ==
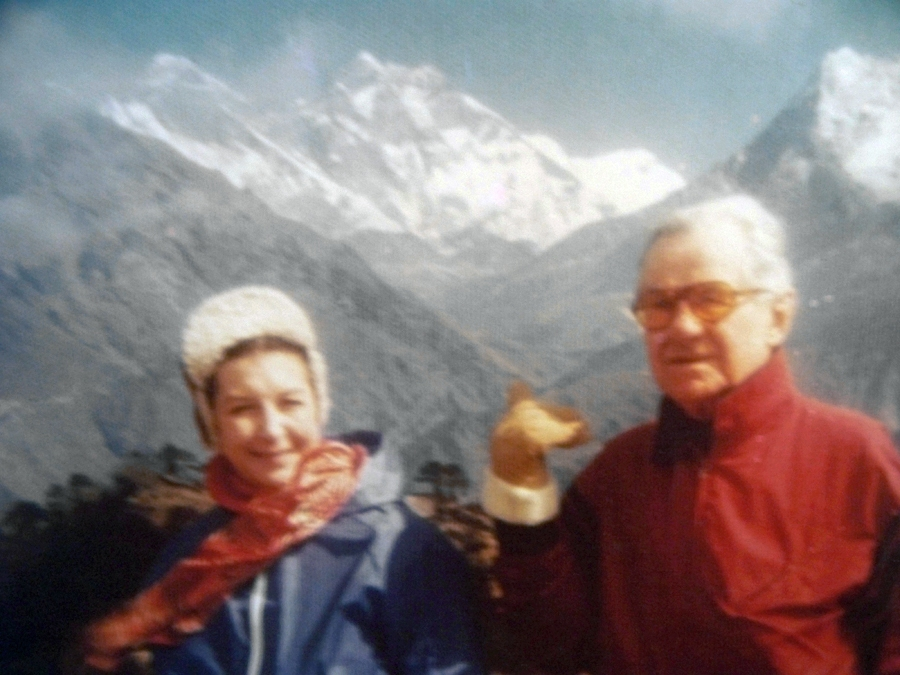
Thomas with his second wife Marianna Munn

Thomas' wife Frances often traveled with him. She died in 1975, and he married Marianna Munn in 1977. They embarked on a 50,000-mile (80,000 km) honeymoon trip that took him to many of his favorite old destinations. Thomas died at his home in Pawling, New York in 1981. He is buried in Christ Church Cemetery. Marianna died in Dayton, Ohio on January 28, 2010.

== Legacy and honors ==
In 1945, Thomas received the Alfred I. duPont Award. In 1971, Thomas received the Golden Plate Award of the American Academy of Achievement, and was honored at the 1973 Peabody Awards. In 1976, President Gerald Ford awarded him the Presidential Medal of Freedom. He has two stars on the Hollywood Walk of Fame. Thomas was inducted into many Halls of Fame:

- 1966 National Ski Hall of Fame
- 1977 National Association of Broadcasters
- 1978 Colorado Ski and Snowboard Hall of Fame
- 1989 National Radio Hall of Fame
- 1992 National Aviation Hall of Fame
- 2018 Laurentian Ski Hall of Fame.

Named after him are the Thomas Mountains in Antarctica, a museum in Victor, Colorado, as well as awards from a number of organizations: 1947 Overseas Press Club of America, 1980 The Explorers Club, 1984 Society of American Travel Writers Foundation, and 2012 Broadcast Pioneers of Colorado.

He was a member of the Sons of the American Revolution and was honored by the Empire State Society (New York) SAR with the Chauncey Depew Medal for his contributions to American history and patriotic education.

The communications building at Marist University in Poughkeepsie, New York is named for Thomas, after he received an honorary degree from the college in 1981. The Lowell Thomas Archives are housed as part of the university library.

== Works ==
=== Bibliography ===
- With Lawrence in Arabia, 1924
- The First World Flight, 1925
- Beyond Khyber Pass, 1925
- Count Luckner, the Sea Devil, 1927
- European Skyways, 1927
- The Boy's Life of Colonel Lawrence, 1927
- Adventures in Afghanistan for Boys, 1928
- Raiders of the Deep, 1928
- The Sea Devil's Fo'c'sle, 1929
- Woodfill of the Regulars, 1929
- The Hero of Vincennes: the Story of George Rogers Clark, 1929
- The Wreck of the Dumaru, 1930
- Lauterbach of the China Sea, 1930
- India--Land of the Black Pagoda, 1930
- Rolling Stone: The Life and Adventures of Arthur Radclyffe Dugmore, 1931
- Tall Stories, 1931
- Kabluk of the Eskimo, 1932
- This Side of Hell, 1932
- Old Gimlet Eye: The Adventures of General Smedley Butler, 1933
- Born to Raise Hell, 1933
- The Untold Story of Exploration, 1935
- Fan Mail, 1935
- A Trip to New York With Bobby and Betty, 1936
- Men of Danger, 1936
- Kipling Stories and a Life of Kipling, 1936
- Seeing Canada With Lowell Thomas, 1936
- Seeing India With Lowell Thomas, 1936
- Seeing Japan With Lowell Thomas, 1937
- Seeing Mexico With Lowell Thomas, 1937
- Adventures Among the Immortals, 1937
- Hungry Waters, 1937
- Wings Over Asia, 1937
- Magic Dials, 1939
- In New Brunswick We'll Find It, 1939
- Soft Ball! So What?, 1940
- How To Keep Mentally Fit, 1940
- Stand Fast for Freedom, 1940
- Pageant of Adventure, 1940
- Pageant of Life, 1941
- Pageant of Romance, 1943
- These Men Shall Never Die, 1943
- Out of this World: Across the Himalayas to Tibet (1951)
- Back to Mandalay, 1951
- Great True Adventures, 1955
- The Story of the New York Thruway, 1955
- Seven Wonders of the World, 1956
- History As You Heard It 1957
- The Story of the St. Lawrence Seaway, 1957
- The Vital Spark, 1959
- Sir Hubert Wilkins, A Biography, 1961
- More Great True Adventures, 1963
- Book of the High Mountains, 1964 (ISBN 978-0671202392)
- Famous First Flights That Changed History, 1968 (ISBN 1-59228-536-8)
- Burma Jack, 1971 (ISBN 0-393-08647-X)
- Doolittle: A Biography, 1976 (ISBN 0-385-06495-0)
- Good Evening Everybody: From Cripple Creek to Samarkand, 1976; subtitled on cover "An Autobiography by Lowell Thomas" (ISBN 0-688-03068-8)
- So Long Until Tomorrow, 1977 (ISBN 0-688-03236-2)

=== Filmography ===
==== Director ====
- With Allenby in Palestine and Lawrence in Arabia (1918)
- Out of This World (1952)
- High Adventure with Lowell Thomas (1957–59)

==== Narrator ====
The following is a selection of films with Thomas as host or narrator.

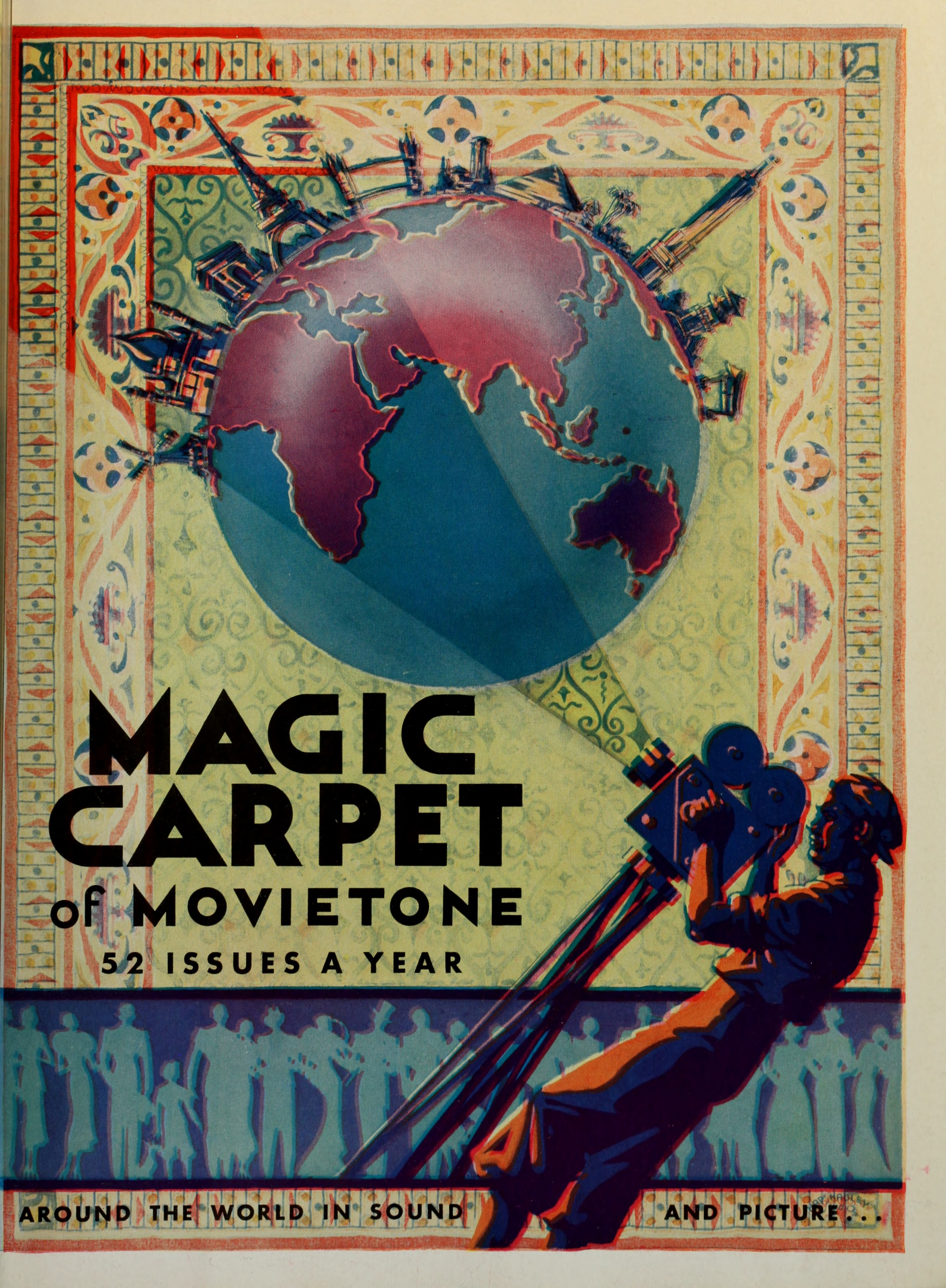
Magic Carpet of Movietone

- Africa Speaks (1930)
- Lowell Thomas Driftin' Around (1931–32)
- The Blonde Captive (1931)
- Movietone News (1932–52)
- The Throne of the Gods (1933)
- Mussolini Speaks (1933)
- Lowell Thomas' Magic Carpet of Movietone (1933–43)
- Going Places with Lowell Thomas (1934–38)
- Schlitz on Mt. Washington (1937)
- Killers of the Sea (1937)
- Titans of the Deep (1938)
- The Lion Has Wings (1940)
- This is Cinerama (1952)
- Seven wonders of the world (1956)
- Search for Paradise (1957)
- Winter Olympics (1960)
- World's Fair report with Lowell Thomas (1963)
- The Best of Cinerama (1963)
- The Great Shikar (1970)
- Lowell Thomas Remembers (1975)

==== Subject ====
The following is a list of films with Thomas as the Subject.

- Sports Parade: King Salmon (1941)
- The Big Picture: Challenge of Ideas (episode 512)
- Yesterday's witness: a tribute to the American newsreel (1977)
- Eulogy, Lowell Thomas (1981)
- Lowell Thomas: Man About the World (2000)
- Lowell Thomas: American storyteller (2008)
- The Voice of America: Lowell Thomas and the Rise of Broadcast Journalism (2019)
