= Vineland Social Maturity Scale =

Social competence assessment

- Purpose: Assess social competence

The Vineland Social Maturity Scale is a psychometric assessment instrument designed to help in the assessment of social competence. It was developed by the American psychologist Edgar Arnold Doll and published in 1940. He published a manual for it in 1953. Doll named it after the Vineland Training School, where he developed it.

== Details ==
The test consists of 8 sub-scales measuring:

- Communication skills
- General self-help ability
- Locomotion skills
- Occupation skills
- Self-direction
- Self-help eating
- Self-help dressing
- Socialization skills

== See also ==
- Vineland Adaptive Behavior Scale

== External resources ==
- Altepeter, T; Moscato, EM; Cummings, JA (October 1986). "Comparison of scores of hearing-impaired children on the Vineland Adaptive Behavior Scales and the Vineland Social Maturity Scale". Psychological Reports. 59 (2 Pt 1): 635–9. doi:10.2466/pr0.1986.59.2.635. PMID 3786629. S2CID 29117433.
- Eggert, D (1973). "[Comparative study on the social competence of mentally retarded children and nonretarded children using the Vineland-Social-Maturity-Scale (VSMS)]". Praxis der Kinderpsychologie und Kinderpsychiatrie (in German). 23 (4): 139–44. PMID 4408987.
- Fromme, Donald Karl (January 1974). "On the use of the vineland social maturity scale as an estimate of intellectual functioning". Journal of Clinical Psychology. 30 (1): 67–68. doi:10.1002/1097-4679(197401)30:1<67::AID-JCLP2270300119>3.0.CO;2-V. PMID 4811928.
- Kaplan, Harriett E.; Alatishe, Moses (January 1976). "Comparison of ratings by mothers and teachers on preschool children using the vineland social maturity scale". Psychology in the Schools. 13 (1): 27–28. doi:10.1002/1520-6807(197601)13:1<27::AID-PITS2310130108>3.0.CO;2-J.
- Krugman, Morris (1956). "Vineland Social Maturity Scale". Journal of Consulting Psychology. 20 (5): 408–409. doi:10.1037/h0038827.
- No authorship indicated (1954). "The measurement of social competence: A manual for the Vineland Social Maturity Scale". Journal of Consulting Psychology. 18 (1): 74. doi:10.1037/h0050243.
- Raggio, DJ; Massingale, TW (October 1990). "Comparability of the Vineland Social Maturity Scale and the Vineland Adaptive Behavior Scale--survey form with infants evaluated for developmental delay". Perceptual and Motor Skills. 71 (2): 415–8. doi:10.2466/pms.1990.71.2.415. PMID 1701239. S2CID 9122805.
- Raggio, DJ; Massingale, TW (December 1993). "Comparison of the Vineland Social Maturity Scale, the Vineland Adaptive Behavior Scales--survey form, and the Bayley Scales of Infant Development with infants evaluated for developmental delay". Perceptual and Motor Skills. 77 (3 Pt 1): 931–7. doi:10.2466/pms.1993.77.3.931. PMID 7506826. S2CID 33488989.
- Roszkowski, MJ (July 1980). "Concurrent validity of the adaptive behavior scale as assessed by the Vineland Social Maturity Scale". American Journal of Mental Deficiency. 85 (1): 86–9. PMID 7446575.
- Shneidman, Edwin S. (1956). "Vineland Social Maturity Scale". Journal of Consulting Psychology. 20 (5): 409–410. doi:10.1037/h0039599.
- Song, AY; Jones, SE (January 1982). "Vineland social maturity scale norm examined--the Wisconsin experience with 0- to 3-year-old children". American Journal of Mental Deficiency. 86 (4): 428–31. PMID 7072767.
