= Cripple Creek-Victor School District RE-1 =

School district in Colorado, United States

Address
- 410 North B Street Cripple Creek, Colorado, 80813; United States

District information
- Motto: "Real Skills for Real Life"
- Grades: Pre-school - 12
- Superintendent: Miriam Mondragon
- NCES District ID: 0803180
- Enrollment: 365

Other information
- Telephone: (719) 689-2661
- Website: ccvschools.com

The Cripple Creek-Victor School District RE-1 is a public school district in Teller County, Colorado, United States, based in Cripple Creek.

It includes Cripple Creek, Victor, Goldfield, and most of Midland.

== Schools ==
Cripple Creek-Victor School District RE-1 has one elementary school and one junior/senior high school.

- Cresson Elementary School
- Cripple Creek-Victor Junior/Senior High School
