= Pearl de Vere =

American prostitute and brothel madam

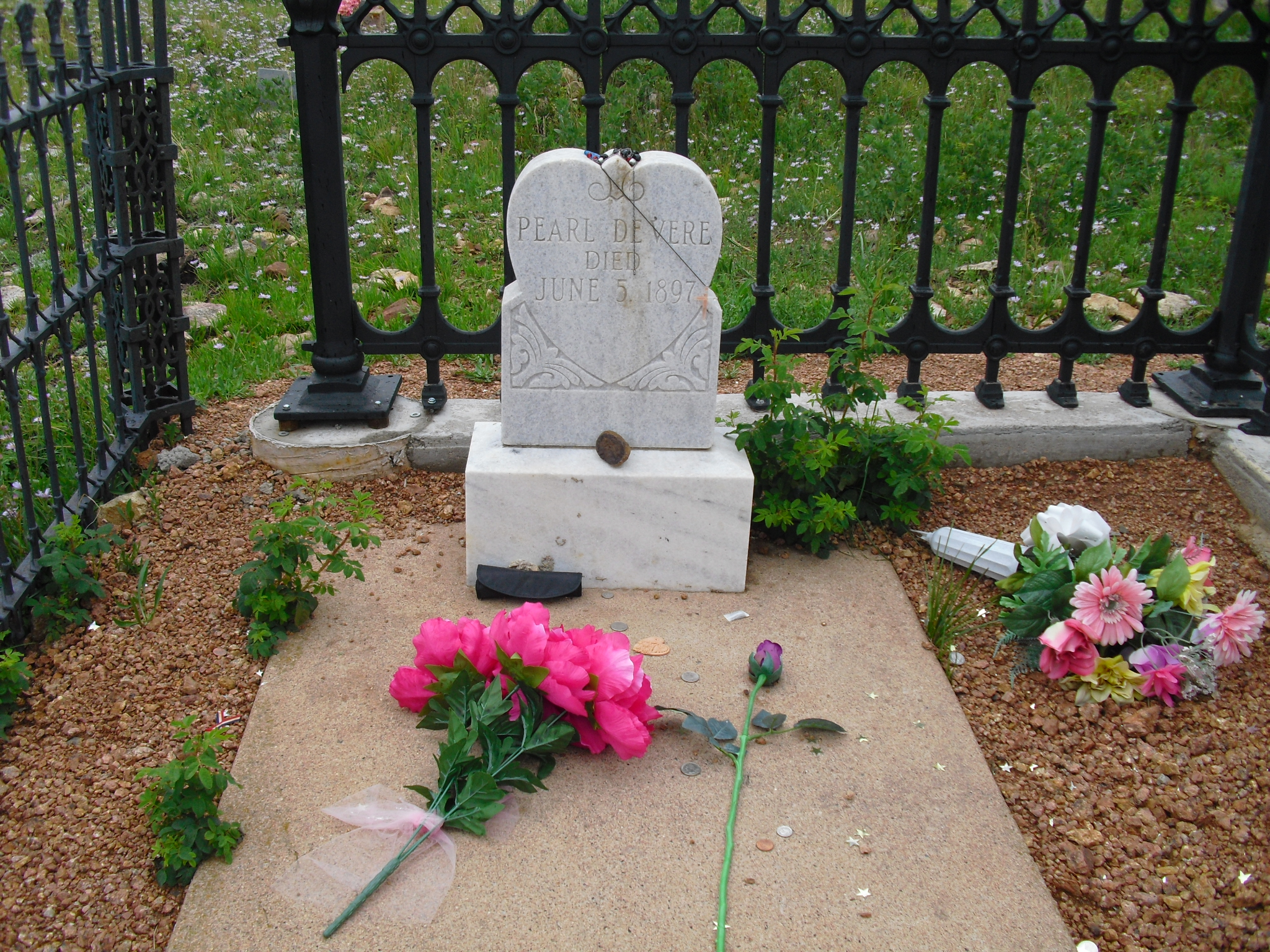
- Grave of Pearl de Vere in Mount Pisgah Cemetery, Cripple Creek, Colorado
- Born: Eliza Martin; October , 1859; Evansville, Indiana, US
- Died: June 5, 1897 (aged 37); Cripple Creek, Colorado, US
- Resting place: Mount Pisgah Cemetery, Cripple Creek; 38.7486°N 105.1944°W
- Other names: Soiled dove of Cripple Creek; Isabelle Martin
- Occupations: Prostitute, brothel madam
- Spouses: Albert Young (m. 1887) C. B. Flynn (m. 1895)

Pearl de Vere (October 1859 – June 5, 1897), known as the "soiled dove of Cripple Creek", was a 19th-century prostitute and madam, and owner of one of the most famed and exclusive brothels in the American Old West.

== Early years ==
DeVere was born Eliza Martin in October 1859 in Evansville, Indiana. Her father was John Marshall Martin, a veteran of the American Civil War. He and his wife Nancy had five children, three sons and two daughters. DeVere arrived in Denver, Colorado in 1877 at age 17 where she worked as a prostitute. She told her sister she was working as a milliner, a respectable occupation for a single woman.

By 1887 she had moved to El Paso County, Colorado, where she married Albert Young, but the couple lived apart. DeVere gave birth to a daughter and it is thought that the child was placed for adoption. During this period, DeVere dyed her hair red, wore fine clothes and jewellery and used the names Isabelle Martin and Mrs. E.A. Martin.

== Life in Cripple Creek ==
Cripple Creek would be the last great Colorado gold rush. Almost overnight, a city sprang up from a small community. The demand for prostitutes in a land where men far outnumbered women was great. "Mrs. Martin", as she had been known previously, changed her name to Pearl de Vere, and began working as a prostitute in Cripple Creek in 1893. Within months, she had started her own brothel, with several girls in her employ.

De Vere had purchased a small frame house on Myers Avenue, from which her business would operate. She was described as being an attractive 31-year-old woman with red hair and a slender build. She was also said to have been a good businesswoman, strong willed, and smart. Her girls were instructed to practice good hygiene, dress well, and have monthly medical examinations. She also chose only the most attractive girls for employment. In return, her girls were well paid for their services.

De Vere catered to the most prosperous men in Cripple Creek, and her brothel soon became the most successful in town. She was well known for wearing lavish clothing in public, and for never being seen twice in the same clothes. In 1895, she met and married businessman C. B. Flynn, a wealthy mill owner. The two had been married only a matter of months before a fire raged through Cripple Creek's business district, destroying most of the businesses, including his mill and her brothel.

In order to recover financially, Flynn accepted a position as a smelter in Monterrey, Mexico. De Vere remained in Cripple Creek, rebuilding her business. With money borrowed from Orinda Straile of New York, she opened The Old Homestead in 1896, a two-story brick building, decorated with lavish carpets, hardwood furniture, and electric lamps. The house was equipped with a telephone, intercom system, and two bathtubs with running water. Each of her girls had her own bedroom, used for entertaining her guests, complete with a dresser, changing screen, and large bed. She also supplied each of her girls with a large trunk that could be secured with a lock, for their personal items. The Cripple Creek City Directory listed a cook, housekeeper, two chamber mai, two butlers, and a musician as employees of the house.

When a client entered the establishment, if he could not decide on a particular girl, he could enter a viewing room, located through a small door on the second floor where the clients could look down through a large window into the parlor where all the girls were gathered. Once the client decided on a woman, she would be brought up to the viewing room, where she would remove all her clothing so that the client could make a final decision.

De Vere held lavish parties with fine food and champagne to bring in clients, and charged $250 per night. On June 4, 1897, she held a large party sponsored by a wealthy admirer which included the best wine and caviar. The admirer had brought her an imported Parisian gown that had cost $800. The two reportedly had an argument, after which the gentleman stormed back to Denver, and Pearl told her girls that she was going up to bed.

== Death ==
During the night after the party, one of the girls checked in on de Vere and found her unconscious in bed. A doctor was summoned, but she was pronounced dead in the early morning hours of June 5, 1897. Her cause of death, according to the coroner, was accidental morphine overdose. It is known that she often did take morphine to help her sleep.

Her sister had been notified by the funeral parlor that she had passed. She journeyed to Cripple Creek from Chicago only to discover that her sister was not a milliner as the family had been led to believe, but a madame at the most notorious brothel in Cripple Creek. Horrified, she refused to have anything to do with the funeral and immediately left.

Despite her success as a madame, de Vere's estate could not afford her a proper burial. Some of the clientele of the Old Homestead had suggested selling the expensive gown that she had been wearing when she had died to cover the funeral expense. Being a well-liked figure, many of the townspeople and miners, sought to make arrangements for her burial until a letter arrived in the mail from the gentleman who had given Pearl her gown. The letter asked that she be buried in the gown and included a check for $1000 to pay for her funeral.

She had the most lavish funeral procession in Cripple Creek. The band played the appropriate somber tunes on the way to the cemetery as many townspeople watched, either out of respect or curiosity. After her burial, they continued to play while heading back into town but lightened the mood with "There'll be a Hot Time in the Old Town Tonight".

De Vere was buried at the Mt. Pisgah cemetery with a wooden marker. By the 1930s, her grave-site had been all but forgotten. However, as tourism for Cripple Creek picked up, her grave marker was replaced with a marble stone. The original wooden headstone can now be seen hanging on the wall in the Cripple Creek District Museum.

== Posthumous ==
From 1897 to 1916, "The Old Homestead" continued its operation under the proprietorship of Hazel Vernon. It later became a boarding house, then a private residence. In 1957, the owners discovered many original items that they wished to share with the tourist public. In June 1958, the residence opened as a museum.

== Bibliography ==
- Dallas, Sandra (1988). Colorado Ghost Towns and Mining Camps. University of Oklahoma Press. ISBN 978-0-8061-2084-3.
- Lee, Mabel Barbee (1984). Cripple Creek Days. U of Nebraska Press. ISBN 978-0-8032-7912-4.
- MacKell, Jan (2004). Brothels, Bordellos, and Bad Girls. University of New Mexico Press. ISBN 978-0-8263-3342-1.
- MacKell, Jan (2011). Red Light Women of the Rocky Mountains (in German). UNM Press. ISBN 978-0-8263-4612-4.
- Plazak, Dan (2006). A Hole in the Ground with a Liar at the Top: Fraud and Deceit in the Golden Age of American Mining. University of Utah Press. ISBN 978-0-87480-840-7.
- Snodgrass, Mary Ellen (2015). Settlers of the American West: The Lives of 231 Notable Pioneers. McFarland. ISBN 978-1-4766-1904-0.
- Wommack, Linda (2005). Our Ladies of the Tenderloin: Colorado's Legends in Lace. Caxton Press. ISBN 978-0-87004-523-3.
