= The Blonde Captive =

1931 film

- Directed by: Clinton Childs; Ralph P. King; Linus J. Wilson; Paul Withington
- Written by: Lowell Thomas
- Narrated by: Lowell Thomas
- Cinematography: George L. Crapp; Thornton P. Dewhurst
- Edited by: Nathan B. Braunstein
- Distributed by: Imperial Pictures
- Release date: 30 December 1931
- Running time: 73 minutes
- Countries: United States; Australia
- Language: English

The Blonde Captive is a 1931 pre-Code film directed by Clinton Childs, Ralph P. King, Linus J. Wilson, and Paul Withington. The film took previously released anthropological footage of native peoples in the Pacific and Australia, and added a sensationalized storyline.

After its 1947 re-screening the film went missing. A full print of the film was later discovered and made commercially available on DVD in 2010. It is also viewable online on YouTube.

== Plot ==
The film is narrated by explorer Lowell Thomas. Dr. Paul Withington of Harvard University and archaeologist Clinton Childs conduct an anthropological expedition to Australia. The film opens with the men discussing the exhibition in "the explorers club". The exhibition hopes to travel and then find the people on earth most related to the ancient Neanderthals. Sailing from the west coast of North America, the expedition filmed indigenous peoples and customs of the islands along the way. The documentary stops in Hawaii and shows Native Hawaiians. It then stops in Bali, where topless Balinese women are shown as they go about their daily life. Also visited are Fijians in Fiji, and Māori living traditionally in New Zealand.

The documentary arrives in Sydney, and the harbor and city are shown. The documentary then traveling by train to Ooldea where they filmed Aboriginal Australians living in the desert. They then travel to Broome and visit the Aboriginal settlement of Boolah Boolah. They then sail to the Timor Sea and film indigenous people fishing. A dugong is cut up, and a sea turtle is dissected alive. The expedition returns to the mainland, where they again meet Aborigines "who have not lost their cannibal instincts." Examining the faces of Aborigines, with flashbacks to an anthropology book, the documentary declares that it has found the people on earth most resembling mankind's ancestor, the Neanderthals.

Hearing rumors of a white woman living with an Aboriginal tribe, the expedition eventually makes its way to a very remote area where they find a white woman who is the sole survivor of a shipwreck. The woman is married to a tribal Aborigine and is mother to his blond-haired child. After inquiring about her welfare, she refuses to return to civilization with them.

== Cast ==
- Lowell Thomas as himself (narrator)
- Dr. Paul Withington as himself
- Clinton Childs as himself

== Production ==
Accompanied by Paul Withington, Clinton Childs and two cinematographers, in 1928 psychologist Stanley Porteus conducted psychological and psychophysical studies of Aboriginal groups in North West Australia and Central Australia. The study was filmed and the resulting documentary was expected to show the results of an officially sanctioned scientific expedition exploring the Indigenous cultures in Northern Australia.

Produced by Porteus' North Western Australian Expedition Syndicate with a grant from the Australian National Research Council, the film was released as a 59-minute National Geographic style documentary by William Pizor's Imperial Pictures in 1931.

It was partially filmed in Pago Pago, American Samoa.

=== Anthropological footage re-edited by Columbia Pictures ===
Following the documentary's debut in New York City, it was re-edited by Columbia Pictures. Fifteen minutes of footage depicting the subplot of a shipwrecked white American woman married to an Aboriginal were added. Renaming the resulting docudrama The Blonde Captive, Columbia released it in 1932. Imperial Pictures re-issued the movie in 1935 and Astor Pictures re-issued it again in 1947.

Contrary to the movie's title, the woman was neither captive nor blonde and she only appears in the movie's final five minutes.

=== Controversy ===
The movie was controversial in Australia for its racist and paternalistic approach to indigenous peoples. It compares the attractiveness of various Polynesian peoples with the "grotesque cannibalistic Aboriginals who are obviously descended from Neanderthal ancestors, behave like monkeys” and who practice "repulsively barbaric" customs. "...here is human life at its lowest form" says Lowell Thomas in his narration.

Promoted as an educational film and advertised as "An Absolutely Authentic Amazing Adventure", the media reviews treated the movie as a documentary. The scientific community denounced the additions to the film as fake, leading to significant academic controversy with accusations that the movie was promoted as an educational film to bypass censorship laws regarding nudity. Dr. Withington made a public statement that footage of the white woman living with Aboriginals was authentic and the participation of Lowell Thomas, a famous explorer who had recently narrated Africa Speaks!, gave the movie credibility with the public.

Stanley Porteus had gained permission for his expedition on the premise that he was making a film about Aboriginal life for educational purposes. After the expedition returned to America, A. O. Neville, the Western Australian chief protector of Aborigines, became concerned about the film when Withington refused to reply to queries while Porteus gave confusing answers. When the film was released, its representation of Aboriginal life had been grossly distorted and manipulated. This had far-reaching consequences for future legitimate research in Western Australia. Only ever screened in North America, the movie was banned in Australia.

=== Film lost ===
After its 1947 screening the film went missing. In 2001, a reconstructed version of the film was restored from a partial nitrate Internegative. The reconstruction was screened at the XXXI Mostra Internazionale del Cinema Libero in Bologna in 2002.

A full print of the film was later discovered and made commercially available on DVD in 2010. The full film is also viewable on YouTube.

== Soundtrack ==
The musical arrangement is by Carl Edouarde.

== See also ==
- Pre-Code Hollywood
