= Mussolini Speaks =

1933 documentary film

Mussolini Speaks is a 1933 documentary film highlighting the first 10 years of Benito Mussolini’s rule as Prime Minister of Italy. Produced and distributed by Columbia Pictures, includes Italian newsreel footage of the Fascists’ March on Rome in 1922, the Lateran Treaty between Italy and The Holy See, engineering projects in Italy and North Africa, and excerpts of speeches by Mussolini. The film was narrated by U.S. radio broadcaster Lowell Thomas.

It was made with Mussolini's full co-operation, beginning with a caption stating: "This picture is dedicated to a man of the people whose deeds for his people will ever be an inspiration to all mankind". A contributor to The Boston Globe wrote: "Mussolini rises above personality. He is a great figure, perhaps one of the greatest in the world today", but the film showed "only a glorified Mussolini". Hearst columnist Arthur Brisbane wrote: "Nicholas Schenck said every intelligent man should see the Columbia Pictures film of Mussolini speaking and in action. He is right. In the faces of the crowds and in their frenzied applause you see Mussolini's absolute hold on the people of Italy." Brisbane thought it demonstrated the "role that talking pictures are destined to play in education".

Mussolini Speaks grossed $1 million in the U.S. To date, Mussolini Speaks has not been released on DVD.
