= Damascus Academy =

Damascus Academy is/was a Quaker school in Damascus, Ohio. The school was founded in 1857 and was chartered under the laws of Ohio by the Friends' Church in 1885.

The psychologist Henry H. Goddard was principal from 1889 to 1891.
