= Vineland Training School =

Non-profit in Vineland, New Jersey, US

Coordinates: 39.4848°N 74.9974°W

The Vineland Training School is a non-profit organization in Vineland, New Jersey with the mission of educating people with developmental disabilities so they can live independently. It has been a leader in research and testing.

The Training School changed its name several times. According to the website of the Vineland Training School, the original official name was "The New Jersey Home for the Education and Care of Feebleminded Children" (1888). This was changed to "The New Jersey Training School" in 1893. In 1911, the name was changed again to "The Training School at Vineland". In 1965 its name was changed to American Institute for Mental Studies- The Training School Unit, or the "AIMS". Finally in 1988 the name "The Training School at Vineland" was restored. However, the literature also makes reference to the "Vineland Training School for Backward and Feeble-minded Children" and "Vineland Training School for Feeble-Minded Girls and Boys" and other variations.

The Psychological Research Laboratory at the Training School was founded in 1906, and was the first research facility devoted to studying mental deficiencies in the US.

== History ==
Cumberland County Senator Stephen Ayres Garrison unsuccessfully attempted to secure funding for a school for intellectually disabled children in New Jersey in 1845.

Reverend S. Olin Garrison was offered the Scarborough Mansion and 40 acres (160,000 m^{2}) to establish a facility for mentally disabled people in Vineland, New Jersey by philanthropist B. D. Maxham. On March 1, 1888, the training school officially opened with 55 children. In 1892 Garrison instituted the "cottage plan" in which the residents lived in small bungalows on the grounds.

Some claim that the Vineland Training School became the 3rd facility of its kind in the US. The first was the Walter E. Fernald State School, established in 1848. The second was Elwyn, established in 1852. However, there were also several related institutions established in the mid-19th century, such as the Syracuse State School in 1853 in New York State, the Private Institute for Imbeciles in Harlem, New York in 1856 and the Newark State School in New York in 1878.

In 1900 Garrison died, and he was succeeded by Professor Edward R. Johnstone. Johnstone founded the Psychological Research Laboratory at the Training School in 1906 under Henry H. Goddard. The Binet-Simon Intelligence Test was translated from French at the Training School in 1908, and standardized by testing 2000 Vineland public school children in the early 20th century under Goddard's direction.

In 1911, the school fed children thyroid, pituitary and pineal glands obtained from animals as part of an experiment to "cure" them of their "feeble-mindedness".

In 1912, Goddard published The Kallikak Family, A Study in the Heredity of Feeble-mindedness, a very early study linking mental incapacity and genetics. However, this study has since been widely discredited. At the request of the US government, Goddard studied immigrants arriving at Ellis Island. Dr. Goddard claimed that 80% of arriving immigrants were feeble-minded. Dr. Goddard also is renowned for having coined the term "moron".

The Army Intelligence Tests used in World War I were developed at the Training School.

Goddard resigned in 1918 and was replaced by Stanley Porteus. Porteus focused on cephalometry, linking head size to intelligence, and X-ray studies. Porteus also developed his own nonverbal intelligence test, the Porteus Maze Test after his experiences administering the Binet tests about 1912 while working as a head teacher at a school for feeble-minded children in Melbourne, Australia. When Porteus left for the University of Hawaii in 1925, he was succeeded by Edgar A. Doll.

Doll directed research in birth injuries, EEG techniques, and adaptive behavior. Doll published the Vineland Social Maturity Scale in 1935. This was adapted for use by the US Army in World War II. By the time Doll left in 1945, the Training school had an established international reputation.

Pearl S. Buck wrote about the Vineland Training School and her daughter's experience in 1950 for the Reader's Digest and Ladies Home Journal in an article entitled "The Child Who Never Grew". This article drew a lot of attention to the Training School.

The Division of Emotional Disturbance was established at the Training School in 1970.

In July and August 1980, the institution was the subject of a six-month undercover investigation by The Record of North Jersey, after Billy Kemner, boy from Emerson, Bergen County was murdered in one of the school's residential cottages. The Record series documented widespread negligence and physical and sexual abuse of AIMS residents by staff. The president of the school, William Smith, was arrested, charged with covering up instances of assaults upon residents. Two high ranking administrators, Thomas Lewis and Noble Prettyman, were arrested and charged on morals violations. The article, by reporters Henry Goldman and Valerie James, won several journalism awards. James, a reporter with an active license as a registered nurse, got hired into the institution's infirmary for two weeks May, 1980. The state of New Jersey took over operations for several months. The Elwyn Institutes of Media, Pennsylvania took the school over in 1981 to avoid it being closed.

In 1987, the School began to move its residents into community group homes and vocational centers. This transition was completed in 1996, and the School now operates 47 group homes and numerous day and work programs in southern New Jersey for adults with developmental disabilities. In recent years, The Training School has been renamed Elwyn New Jersey, in accordance to the role Elwyn Institutes in Media, Pennsylvania has with the campus. The current executive director is William Hartley.

== Agricultural experiments ==
The Training School owned a farm, operated by the students. The Training School was often involved with agricultural research in its early years. It researched growing peaches with the New Jersey State Experimental Station in 1905, and growing grapes for the U.S. Department of Agriculture. It created the Vineland International Egg Laying and Breeding Contest in 1916. In 1917 it devoted 10 acres (40,000 m^{2}) to the study of 80 different varieties of grapes for the Department of Agriculture. In 1926, the Training School was involved in a study of irrigation, again for the Department of Agriculture.

== Trivia ==
Author Pearl S. Buck placed her daughter Carol in the Vineland Training School.

== See also ==
- E. R. Johnstone Training and Research Center
