= Schlitz on Mt. Washington =

1937 film by Christopher Young

- Directed by: Christopher Young
- Written by: Christopher Young
- Produced by: Christopher Young
- Starring: Christopher Young
- Narrated by: Lowell Thomas
- Cinematography: Winston Pote, J.V.D. Bucher, Harry Dunham
- Edited by: Christopher Young
- Music by: James Bradford
- Release date: 1937
- Running time: 22 min.
- Country: United States
- Language: English

Schlitz on Mt. Washington is a 1937 (Note: Published articles have given the year as 1935 and 1936, but the copyright notice in the opening credits reads "MCMXXXVII," or 1937.) short film by American filmmaker Christopher Young. Shot on location on Mount Washington, New Hampshire using 35 mm, the film is said to have required a "Herculean effort," since all the camera equipment and reels had to be hiked up the mountainside. The film contains a cameo appearance by alpine skier Mary Bird, who competed at the 1936 Winter Olympics. All dialogue and description in the film is conveyed through the narration supplied by newscaster Lowell Thomas.

== Plot ==
Dr. Wolfgang Schlitz, a "gentleman of leisure" with an exaggerated mustache visiting New Hampshire on a holiday from Obergurgl, arrives by car at the foot of Mt. Washington to find the road is closed, though there is no snow on the ground. Since his chauffeur cannot drive him to the top, he ascends on foot dressed in wool pants with spats and a tyrolean hat. For gear he carries only an umbrella and a sticker-covered suitcase containing alcohol and other supplies. Wooden signs warn of hazardous conditions, but he continues up the trail.

As the temperature drops, Schlitz opens his suitcase to pull out his windbreaker but finds that his chauffeur has packed a fancy coat instead. A playbill for the Metropolitan Opera falls out of the pocket, prompting a surreal daydream of a ballerina among the boulders. The mist grows hazy and Schlitz becomes lost. He soon collapses from exhaustion and wakes to snowfall. Continuing his ascent along the tracks of the cog railway, he reaches the observatory at the summit but is told by the attendant he must stay in Camden Cottage, from the windows of which he watches the sun set.

In the morning Schlitz buys a pair of skis and looks for snow, though it exists only in patches. Skiing between rocks, he accidentally drops his suitcase and chases after it. Soon he encounters the "Mad Monk of Mt. Washington," who constructs a makeshift dummy of a female skier and sends her off a cliff, luring Schlitz perilously close to the edge.

Schlitz catches up with his bag, but soon drops it again into a river of snowmelt. Catching it and dropping it multiple times, he eventually fishes it out of the plunge pool of a waterfall, where he finds the suitcase broken open but the bottle of liquor intact and has one last drink before discarding it. Schlitz attempts to approach two young female hikers but they ignore his clumsy advances.

Meanwhile, the Monk is on the trail ahead of Schlitz, eating bananas and tossing the peels on a bridge and on a set of stone steps. Schlitz slips and loses consciousness. The Monk runs down to the ranger station and reports the accident. Rangers summon the chauffeur and carry Schlitz down to the trailhead on a stretcher, whereupon they bail him into his car. Just as Schlitz and his chauffeur are pulling away, a crowd of female hikers cheers, seeing him off.

== Legacy ==
The short has been called a "ski farce on film" and the "first American comedy-adventure classic," as well as an inspiration to the 1942 comedy Dr. Quackenbush Skis The Headwall. Schlitz on Mt. Washington has enjoyed cult status at Dartmouth College, where it has been screened annually since the 1970s to first-year students on trips to the Moosilauke Ravine Lodge. Members of the "Lodj Croo" have created an ever-changing list of "callbacks" to be shouted at the screen at key moments in the film, similar to the audience responses popular at screenings of The Rocky Horror Picture Show.

== See also ==
- Mountain film
