= Marie Skodak Crissey =

American developmental psychologist

- Born: Marie Paula Skodak; January 10, 1910; Lorain, Ohio, United States
- Died: December 5, 2000 (aged 90); Flint, Michigan, United States
- Education: Ohio State University (MA) University of Iowa (PhD)
- Occupation: Developmental psychologist
- Spouse: Orlo Crissey (m. 1966)

Marie Skodak Crissey (10 January 1910 – 5 December 2000) was an American developmental psychologist who specialized in intelligence testing, school psychology service administration, and special education. She authored several books and articles on these subjects, and her work has often been cited in research on the development and intelligence of children in relation to adoption and child care. She was an active member of several divisions of the American Psychological Association and served as President of the Division of Consulting Psychology and the Division on Mental Retardation (now the Division of Intellectual and Developmental Disabilities).

== Early life and education ==
Marie Skodak Crissey was born Marie Paula Skodak on January 10, 1910, in Lorain, Ohio. Her parents were both teachers and recent immigrants from Hungary. Crissey developed an interest in chemistry and psychology, and achieved both an undergraduate teaching degree and a master's degree in clinical psychology from Ohio State University in 1931. Her mentor was Henry H. Goddard. Despite the influence of Goddard's hereditarian view of intellectual development, she adopted the view of environmental determinism while pursuing her Ph.D. in developmental psychology from the University of Iowa. It was here that she met industrial psychologist Orlo Crissey, whom she later married in 1966. She joined the Sigma Xi honors society in 1937. Crissey received her Ph.D. in 1938.

== Work ==
While studying at Iowa, Crissey worked at the Iowa State Board of Control under psychologist Harold M. Skeels, with whom she would conduct much of her research, and as assistant state psychologist. During this time, she conducted pre-adoption psychological evaluations on children in order to match them with their adoptive families. After earning her Ph.D., she began work as assistant director and, in 1942, director of the Flint Guidance Center in Flint, Michigan. During this time she worked in private practice, becoming one of two psychologists and the only woman in the state to do so. She later became director of the Division of Psychological Services at Dearborn schools in Dearborn, Michigan in 1948. In this role, she supervised the evaluation and education of children with special needs, and helped to integrate children previously deemed uneducable into classrooms.

Much of Crissey's research focused on the education and development of children with intellectual disabilities. She argued that children whose mothers were deemed "feeble-minded" were capable of average intellectual development in foster homes, going against hereditarian theories of intelligence. Her research with Skeels on the subject of adoption and intelligence has been frequently cited regarding the impact of child care on development. She considered her work on this subject critical to the development of Head Start education programs and changes to adoption practices in the United States.

Crissey joined the American Psychological Association in 1938. She was one of forty-eight participants in the 1954 Thayer Conference, which helped to formally define the field of school psychology and to establish a consensus on the field's training and major functions. The conference was a pivotal event in the history of school psychology. In 1972, she received the American Psychological Association's Distinguished Service Award from the Division on School Psychology.

Crissey's papers are held by the Archives of the History of American Psychology at the Cummings Center for the History of Psychology in Akron, Ohio.

== Publications ==
- Crissey, M. S. (1975). Mental retardation: Past, present, and future. American Psychologist, 30(8), 800–808.
- Crissey, M. S., & Rosen, M. (1986). Institutions for the mentally retarded: A changing role in changing times. Austin, TX: Pro-Ed.
- Scholl, G. T., Bauman, M. K., & Crissey, M. S. (1969). A study of the vocational success of groups of the visually handicapped: Final report. Ann Arbor, MI: University of Michigan School of Education.
- Skeels H., & Skodak, M. (1965). Techniques for a high yield follow-up study in the field. Public Health Reports, 80, 249–257.
- Skodak, M. (1939). Children in foster homes: A study of mental development. Iowa City, IA: The University of Iowa.
- Skodak, M. (1950). Mental growth of adopted children in the same family. The Pedagogical Seminary and Journal of Genetic Psychology, 77, 3–9.
- Skodak, M., & Skeels, H. M. (1945). A follow-up study of children in adoptive homes. The Pedagogical Seminary and Journal of Genetic Psychology, 66, 21–58.
- Skodak, M., & Skeels, H. M. (1949). A final follow-up study of one hundred adopted children. The Pedagogical Seminary and Journal of Genetic Psychology, 75, 85–125.
- Wellman, B., Skeels, H., & Skodak, M. (1940). Review of McNemar's critical examination of Iowa studies. Psychological Bulletin, 37, 93–111.
