= Vineland Adaptive Behavior Scale =

Developmental assessment scale for children and adolescents

- Purpose: assess intellectual disability

The Vineland Adaptive Behavior Scale is a psychometric instrument used in child and adolescent psychiatry and clinical psychology. It is used especially in the assessment of individuals with an intellectual disability, a pervasive developmental disorder, and other types of developmental delays.

== History ==
The Vineland Adaptive Behavior Scale was first published in 1984, as a revision of the Vineland Social Maturity Scale, which is named after Vineland Training School in Vineland, New Jersey where Edgar Doll had developed it.

In 2005, Vineland-II was published, which added a 4th domain of motor skills, and in 2016 Vineland-3 was published, where the overall number of items on the scale increased by 34%.

== Purpose ==
The Vineland Adaptive Behavior Scale assesses a person's adaptive level of functioning by standardized interview of the person or their caregiver through their activities of daily living such as walking, talking, getting dressed, going to school, preparing a meal, etc. The original Vineland interview assessed three domains: communication, socialization and daily living, which correspond to the 3 domains of adaptive functioning recognized by the American Association on Intellectual and Developmental Disabilities namely conceptual skills (language and literacy, mathematics, time and number concepts, and self-direction), social skills and practical skills of daily living.

== Limitations ==
Since no gold standard for evaluation of adaptive behavior exists, the test validity of this tool is unknown.

== See also ==
- Vineland Social Maturity Scale
