= Cripple Creek-Victor Junior/Senior High School =

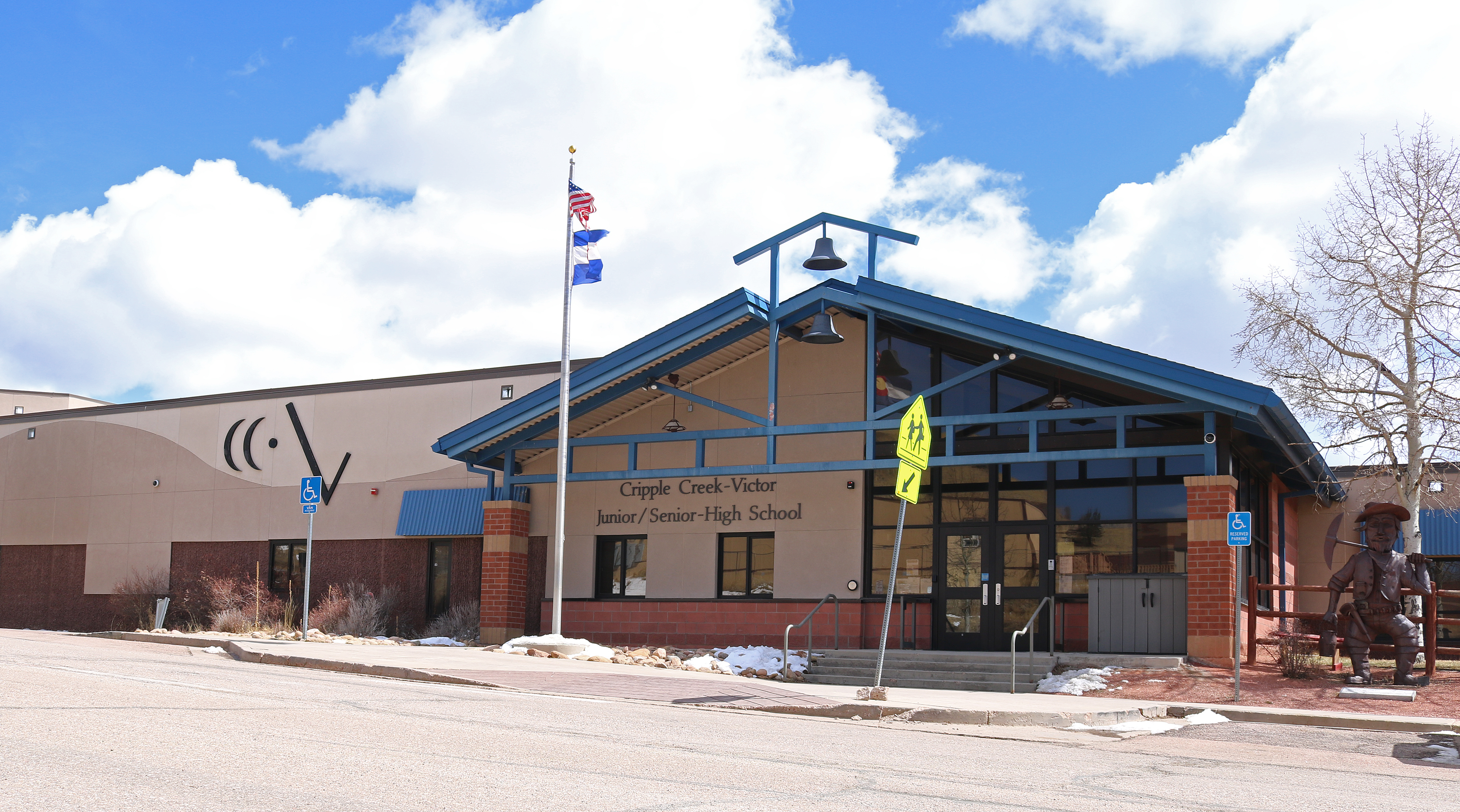
- The school's main entrance area

Location
- 401 North B Street; Cripple Creek, Colorado 80813; United States
- Coordinates: 38°45′3″N 105°11′4″W

Information
- Other name: Cripple Creek-Victor High School
- School type: Public school
- School district: Cripple Creek-Victor RE-1
- CEEB code: 060335
- NCES School ID: 080318000281
- Principal: Dan Cummings
- Grades: 6–12
- Enrollment: 159 (2023-2024)
- Colors: Red, white, blue
- Athletics conference: CHSAA
- Mascot: Pioneer
- Website: ccvschools.com

Cripple Creek-Victor Junior/Senior High School is a high school in Cripple Creek, Colorado, United States, also serving the city of Victor. It is the sole high school in the Cripple Creek-Victor School District RE-1.

== Notable alumni ==
- Ralph Lawrence Carr
- Lowell Thomas – class of 1910
- Rileah Vanderbilt – class of 1998; film and television actress
- A. M. Watson – class of 1994; inventor, attorney, and author of "Infants of the Brush: A Chimney Sweep's Story."
