= Henry H. Goddard =

American psychologist and eugenicist (1866–1957)

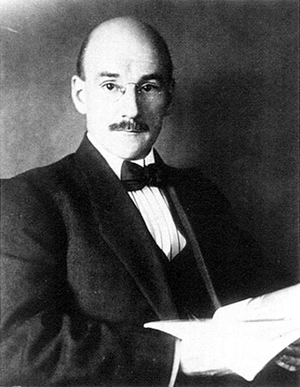
- Born: August 15, 1866; Vassalboro, Maine
- Died: June 18, 1957 (aged 90); Santa Barbara, California, U.S.
- Occupations: Academic psychologist, American football coach
- Known for: Eugenicist and segregationist

Academic background
- Education: Haverford College Clark University

Academic work
- Discipline: Psychologist
- Sub-discipline: Intelligence
- Institutions: University of Southern California; Damascus Academy; West Chester, Pennsylvania's State Normal School
- Notable students: Marie Skodak Crissey

Henry Herbert Goddard (August 14, 1866 – June 18, 1957) was an American psychologist, eugenicist, and segregationist during the early 20th century. He is known especially for his 1912 work The Kallikak Family: A Study in the Heredity of Feeble-Mindedness, which he himself came to regard as flawed for its ahistoric depiction of the titular family, and for translating the Binet-Simon Intelligence Test into English in 1908 and distributing an estimated 22,000 copies of the translated test across the United States. He also introduced the term "moron" for clinical use.

He was the main advocate for the use of intelligence testing in societal institutions including hospitals, schools, the legal system and the military. He helped develop the new topic of clinical psychology, in 1911 helped to write the first U.S. law requiring that blind, deaf and intellectually disabled children be provided special education within public school systems, and in 1914 became the first American psychologist to testify in court that subnormal intelligence should limit the criminal responsibility of defendants.

== Early life ==
Goddard was born in Vassalboro, Maine, the fifth and youngest child and only son of farmer Henry Clay Goddard and his wife, Sarah Winslow Goddard, who were devout Quakers. (Two of his sisters died in infancy.) His father was gored by a bull when the younger Goddard was a small child, and he eventually lost his farm and had to work as a farmhand; he died of his lingering injuries when the boy was nine years old. The younger Goddard went to live with his married sister for a brief time but in 1877 was enrolled at the Oak Grove Seminary, a boarding school in Vassalboro.

During this period, Sarah Goddard began a new career as a traveling Quaker preacher; she married missionary Jehu Newlin in 1884, and the couple regularly traveled throughout the United States and Europe. In 1878, Henry Goddard became a student at the Moses Brown School in Providence, Rhode Island. During his youth he began an enduring friendship with Rufus Jones, who would later co-found (in 1917) the American Friends Service Committee, which received the 1947 Nobel Peace Prize.

In 1883 Goddard entered Haverford College, where he played on the football team, graduating in 1887. He adjourned his studies for a year to teach in Winthrop, Maine, from 1885 to 1886. After graduating, he traveled to California to visit one of his sisters, stopping en route in Los Angeles to present some letters of introduction at the University of Southern California, which had been established just seven years earlier. After seeking jobs in the Oakland area for several weeks, he was surprised to receive an offer of a temporary position at USC, and there he taught Latin, history and botany. He also served as co-coach (with Frank Suffel) of the first USC football team in 1888, with the team winning both of its games against a local athletic club. But he departed immediately thereafter, returning to Haverford to earn his master's degree in mathematics in 1889.

From 1889 to 1891, he became principal of the Damascus Academy, a Quaker school in Damascus, Ohio, where he also taught several subjects and conducted chapel services and prayer meetings. On August 7, 1889, he married Emma Florence Robbins, who became one of the two other teachers at the academy. In 1891 he returned to teach at the Oak Grove Seminary in Vassalboro, becoming principal in 1893. He enrolled in 1896 at Clark University, intending to study only briefly, but he remained three years and received his doctorate in psychology in 1899. He then taught at the State Normal School in West Chester, Pennsylvania until 1906.

== Vineland ==
From 1906 to 1918, Goddard was the Director of Research at the Vineland Training School for Feeble-Minded Girls and Boys in Vineland, New Jersey, which was the first known laboratory established to study intellectual disability. While there, he is quoted as stating: "Democracy, then, means that the people rule by selecting the wisest, most intelligent and most human to tell them what to do to be happy." [Italics are Goddard's.]

At the May 18, 1910, annual meeting of the American Association for the Study of the Feeble-Minded, Goddard proposed definitions for a system for classifying individuals with intellectual disability based on intelligence quotient (IQ). Goddard used the terms moron for those with an IQ of 51–70, imbecile for those with an IQ of 26–50, and idiot for those with an IQ of 0-25 for categories of increasing impairment. This nomenclature was standard for decades. A moron, by his definition, was any adult with a mental age between eight and twelve. Morons, according to Goddard, were unfit for society and should be removed from society either through institutionalization, sterilization, or both.

Goddard's best-known work, The Kallikak Family, was published in 1912. He had studied the background of several local groups of people that were somewhat distantly related and concluded that they were all descended from a single Revolutionary War soldier. Martin Kallikak (a pseudonym) first married a Quaker woman. All of the children who came from this relationship were "wholesome" and had no signs of intellectual disability. Later, it was discovered that Kallikak had had an affair with a "nameless feeble-minded woman". The result of this union resulted in generations of criminals. Goddard termed this generation "a race of defective degenerates". While the book rapidly became a success and was considered for making into a Broadway play, his research methods were soon questioned; within ten years he came to agree with the critics and no longer endorsed his conclusions. It is now accepted that Goddard in fact fabricated the Kallikak data, rendering his conclusions unproven and highly dubious.

Goddard was a strong advocate of eugenics. Although he believed that "feeble-minded" people bearing children was inadvisable, he hesitated to promote compulsory sterilization – even though he was convinced that it would eliminate intellectual disability – because he did not think such a plan could gain widespread acceptance. Instead, he suggested that colonies should be established where the "feeble-minded" could be segregated.

Goddard established an intelligence testing program on Ellis Island in 1913. The purpose of the program was to identify "feeble-minded" persons whose nature was not obvious to the subjective judgement of immigration officers, who had previously made these judgments without the aid of tests. When he published the results in 1917, Goddard stated that his results only applied to immigrants traveling steerage and did not apply to people traveling in first or second class. He also noted that the population he studied had been preselected, omitting those who were either "obviously normal" or "obviously feeble-minded", and stated that he made "no attempt to determine the percentage of feeble-minded among immigrants in general or even of the special groups named – the Jews, Hungarians, Italians, and Russians"; however, he immediately followed this up by stating that "the figures would only need to be revised (reduced) by a relatively small amount" because "[very obviously high-grade intelligent immigrants] were so small a part of the group [of Ellis Island immigrants] that they did not noticeably affect the character of the group."

The program found an estimated 80% of the population of immigrants studied were "feeble-minded". Goddard and his associates tested a group of 35 Jewish, 22 Hungarian, 50 Italian, and 45 Russian immigrants who had been identified as "representative of their respective groups". The results found that 83% of Jews, 80% of Hungarians, 79% of Italians, and 80% of Russians of the study population were "feeble-minded". The untrue claim that this referred to findings made by Goddard in respect to the greater population of Jewish, Hungarian, Italian and Russian immigrants has been widely publicized. Not trusting such extreme results, Goddard then adjusted the threshold of "feeble-mindedness" such that only about 40% of the immigrants were deemed to be morons.

Claims are made that the Immigration Act of 1924 was strongly influenced by intelligence testing, which was backed up by the American Psychologist.

Goddard also publicized alleged race-group differences revealed by Army IQ tests (Army Alpha and Beta) during World War I (the results were, even in their day, challenged as scientifically inaccurate, and later resulted in a retraction from the director of the project, Carl Brigham) and claimed that the results showed that Americans were unfit for democracy.

== Later career ==
In 1918 he became director of the Ohio Bureau of Juvenile Research, and in 1922 he became a professor in the Department of Abnormal and Clinical Psychology at the Ohio State University, a job he possessed until his retirement in 1938. His wife, Emma, died in October 1936; they did not have any children. He received an honorary law degree from Ohio State in 1943 and an honorary degree from the University of Pennsylvania in 1946. Also in 1946, he was among the endorsers of Albert Einstein's Emergency Committee of Atomic Scientists.

By the 1920s, Goddard had come to believe that he had made numerous errors in his early research and regarded The Kallikak Family as obsolete. It was also noted that Goddard was more concerned about making eugenics popular rather than conducting actual scientific studies. He devoted the later part of his career to seeking improvements in education, reforming environmental influences in childhood, and publicizing better child-rearing practices. But others continued to use his early work to support various arguments with which Goddard did not agree. He was constantly perplexed by the fact that later polemicists claimed that his studies were dangerous to society despite presenting immigrant groups as immoral and less intelligent by falsely claiming the sample was "representative of their respective groups" whilst advocating removal of such people from society. Henry Garrett of Columbia University was one of the few scientists to continue to use The Kallikak Family as a reference.

Goddard relocated to Santa Barbara, California, in 1947. He died at his home there at age 90, and his cremated remains were interred with those of his wife at the Siloam Cemetery, Vineland, New Jersey.

== Publications ==
- The Kallikak Family: A Study in the Heredity of Feeble-Mindedness (1912)
- Standard method for giving the Binet test (1913)
- Feeble-Mindedness: Its Causes and Consequences (1914)
- School Training of Defective Children (1914)
- The Criminal Imbecile: An Analysis of Three Remarkable Murder Cases (1915)
- Mental Tests and the Immigrant (1917)
- Psychology of the Normal and Subnormal (1919)
- Human Efficiency and Levels of Intelligence (1920)
- Juvenile Delinquency (1921)
- Two Souls in One Body? (1927)
- School Training of Gifted Children (1928)
- How to Rear Children in the Atomic Age (1948)

== See also ==
- Eugenics in the United States
- Robert F. Kennedy, Jr.
- Mainstreaming in education

== Notes and references ==
- Zenderland, Leila (1998). Measuring Minds: Henry Herbert Goddard and the Origins of American Intelligence Testing. Cambridge: Cambridge University Press. ISBN 0-521-44373-3.
- The Vineland Training School. Goddard and Eugenics. https://web.archive.org/web/20071213050020/http://www.vineland.org/history/trainingschool/history/eugenics.htm
- Samelson 1982, "H.H. Goddard and the immigrants". American Psychologist 37, pg1291–2.
