= Porteus Maze test =

Psychological test

The Porteus Maze test (PMT) is a psychological test. It is designed to measure psychological planning capacity and foresight. It is a nonverbal test of intelligence. It was developed by University of Hawaiʻi psychology Professor Stanley Porteus.

The test consists of a set of mazes for the subject to solve. The mazes are of varying complexity. The test runs for 15–60 minutes, allowing the subject to solve as many mazes as possible. The test serves as a supplementary subtest of the Wechsler intelligence scales.

The test is suitable for ages 3 and up. The original version was developed by Porteus when he was head teacher of the Victorian Education Department's first special school in Melbourne, Australia. Porteus developed his idea further when he migrated to Vineland, New Jersey and then Hawaii. The "Vineland Series" is an intermediate form. Additional mazes were provided in the Porteus Maze Extension and the Porteus Maze Supplement.

== Rationale ==
Porteus' test was a reaction to the restrictions of the Binet-Simon scales. Mazes in general are thought to assess selection, trial, rejection or adoption of alternative sequences of conduct or thought. Porteus asserted that, like the Binet-Simon scale, it is a valuable supplement in evaluating subjects' foresight and planning abilities. Porteus considered that this capacity was essential for adaptation to practical life situations and the failure of tests to measure it resulted in flawed diagnoses and inadequate assessments. The author proposed that the test be used to select patients for psychosurgery.

== Test description ==
Participants must trace through a maze without crossing maze lines, entering a "blind alley" or backtracking. Participants who violate these rules then work the same maze for a reduced score. The level of difficulty of the maze determines the typical number of failed attempts. The number of trials required to complete a given maze is the measure. The number of seconds to finish each maze is an indicator of cognitive efficiency, since time may be spent on apparently fast but incorrect decisions.

== Scoring ==
Participant scores are calculated by summing errors that include touching lines within the maze, cutting corners and lifting the pen/finger. The time it takes to finish the test is also measured.
A mental age score is calculated according to standard procedures. Two scores are involved: a test quota (TQ) assumed to measure nonverbal forethought and planning ability and a qualitative (Q) score based upon the style and quality of test performance. The qualitative score is a measure of impulse control and distinguishes groups differing in impulsiveness.

== Correlations ==
High qualitative scoring (Q scores) indicate intellectual dullness. High Q scores also relate to verbal and performance intelligence. In social contexts, high Q scores are associated with truancy and delinquency.

When the Q scores of delinquent and normal groups are compared, the differences are reliable and highly significant. Participants who are less inhibited, obstinate and perseverative had difficulty with each new presentation of the maze test. They often repeated their original, incorrect route, often saying they knew that the particular route was incorrect. Administered regardless of native language, disability status and to literacy. In most cases their scores were low. Subjects unused to tests required additional training in the test-taking procedure.

Later studies established the validity of the test as a sensitive tool. Many early comparisons with other intelligence tests found moderate to high correlation coefficients. As a nonverbal test it was not expected to have a high correlation with verbal tests, but the correlation is at least moderately positive.

== Validity and reliability ==
To assess the validity of Q scores, O' Keefe compared the performance of high and low impulse groups. This found no difference in Q scores based on ratings in institutionalized, delinquent, non-delinquent and extreme groups.

Riddle and Roberts argued that the test is a reliable and valid measure of foresight, impulsivity, judgment, planning ability and ability to delay gratification. They reported that the test showed acceptable psychometric properties and inter-rater reliability. They found that Q score distinguished recidivist from non-recidivist delinquent groups and found the score the most sensitive to differences in social adjustment.

Porteus claimed that the reliability of his test was .96.

== Revisions ==
The original Porteus Maze test was introduced in August 1914 during a session held by the Education Section of the British Association for the Advancement of Science. The original test lacked explanation for practice effects in retesting. The test was revised each year, becoming progressively more difficult.

=== Vineland revision ===
This revision consists of 12 mazes for subjects 3 through 12, 14 and Adult. The purpose of this revision was to standardize the test, account for sex differences in performance, achieve correlations with the Binet-Simon scale and the US Army test and estimate social capability and industrial aptitude. An extension of the original test was devised to reduce practice learning as a result of the re-administration of the same test. Use of the extension was expected to improve test-retest reliability.

=== Extension ===
This series was published by the Centre de Psychologie Appliquée in 1958. The extension contains eight mazes created as a measure for ages 7–12, 14 and adults. The most useful contribution of this revision was its sensitivity to brain damage. It has been used with primitive peoples, particularly for indigenous Australians and for African pygmies and bushmen.

=== Supplement ===
This revised test has eight mazes for ages 7–12, 14 and Adult. They are more difficult than the corresponding tests in the extension.

== Other spatial ability tests ==
Directing a pen through a maze printed on paper—or guiding a steerable object - through a maze - requires the ability to project onto the steered object. In evaluating OZNAKI, an Australian educational robotics project inspired by Seymour Papert's Logo programming language, students were tested on Porteus-inspired tests, and on Piaget's Mountains Puzzle. Statistically significant enhancement was measured with senior primary and junior secondary students over just eight sessions with OZNAKI in lieu of other math lessons. Compared to control groups (who had "normal" math lessons) Cohen and Green's findings indicate that the capability measured by the tests is not intrinsic and should not be seen as a measure of intrinsic intelligence.

== Use ==
Maze tests are used in many areas for its measurements of qualities such as self-control, tact, prudence and planning. Performance on this test were used to measure effects of chlorpromazine and to find whether its effects were permanent or temporary. Researchers concluded that chlorpromazine had no significant effect on test performance or clinical behavior.

In a neuropharmacology study the Porteus maze along with the Tower of London test was used with survivors of severe head trauma. The study concluded that individuals with frontal lobe lesions solved the Porteus maze slower than demographically matched uninjured individuals. The test is used as a measure of social adjustment. The test found use as a socio-industrial index and as a measure of social inadequacy. The test also demonstrated sensitivity to loss of social function and planning capacity following psychosurgery. The later applications of the test have shown the deficit regained most likely due to practice-learning.

== See also ==
- Psychometrics
- Intelligence quotient
