= Woodington, Ohio =

Unincorporated community in Ohio, U.S.

Coordinates: 40°10′42″N 84°40′40″W

Woodington is an unincorporated community in Darke County, in the U.S. state of Ohio.

== History ==
Woodington was laid out in 1871. The community most likely was named after John Woodington, an early settler.

== Notable person ==
- Lowell Thomas, journalist, broadcaster, and writer
