= Cripple Creek, Colorado =

City in Colorado, US

- Statutory city
- City of Cripple Creek
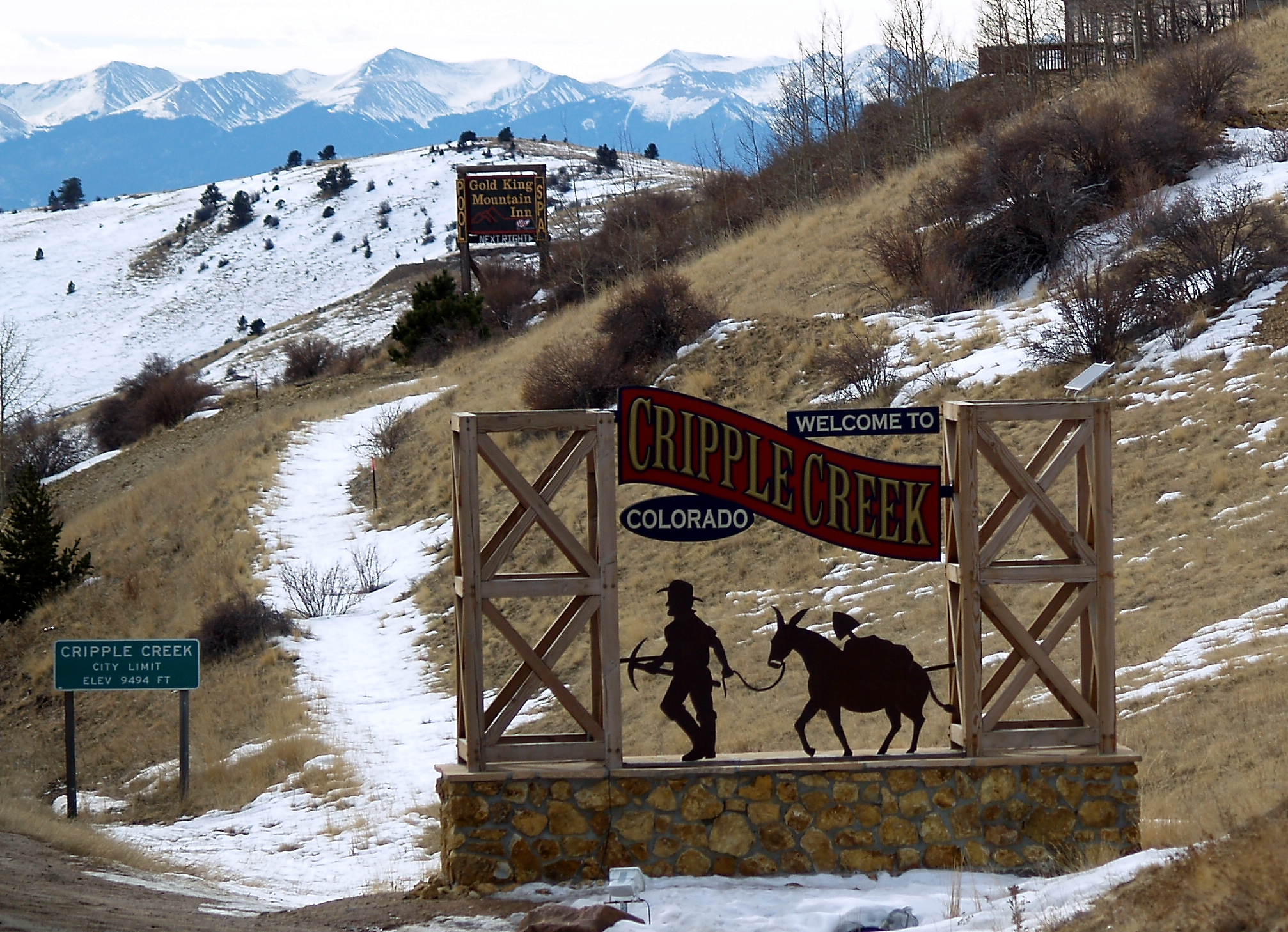
- Entering Cripple Creek
- Motto: "Real Fun, Real Colorado."
- Location of the City of Cripple Creek in Teller County, Colorado
- Coordinates: 38°44′54″N 105°10′55″W
- Country: United States
- State: Colorado
- County: Teller
- Incorporated: June 9, 1892

Government
  - Type: statutory city

Area
  - Total: 1.522 sq mi (3.941 km^{2})
  - Land: 1.522 sq mi (3.941 km^{2})
  - Water: 0 sq mi (0.000 km^{2})
- Elevation: 9,456 ft (2,882 m)

Population (2020)
  - Total: 1,155
  - Density: 759.1/sq mi (293.1/km^{2})
- Time zone: UTC−07:00 (MST)
  - Summer (DST): UTC−06:00 (MDT)
- ZIP code: 80813
- Area code: 719
- GNIS city ID: 2410265
- FIPS code: 18530
- Website: cityofcripplecreek.com

Cripple Creek is the statutory city that is the county seat of Teller County, Colorado, United States. The city population was 1,155 at the 2020 United States census. Cripple Creek is a former gold mining camp located 20 miles (32 km) southwest of Colorado Springs near the base of Pikes Peak. The Cripple Creek Historic District, which received National Historic Landmark status in 1961, includes all of the city and the surrounding area. The city is now a part of the Colorado Springs, CO Metropolitan Statistical Area and the Front Range Urban Corridor.

== History ==
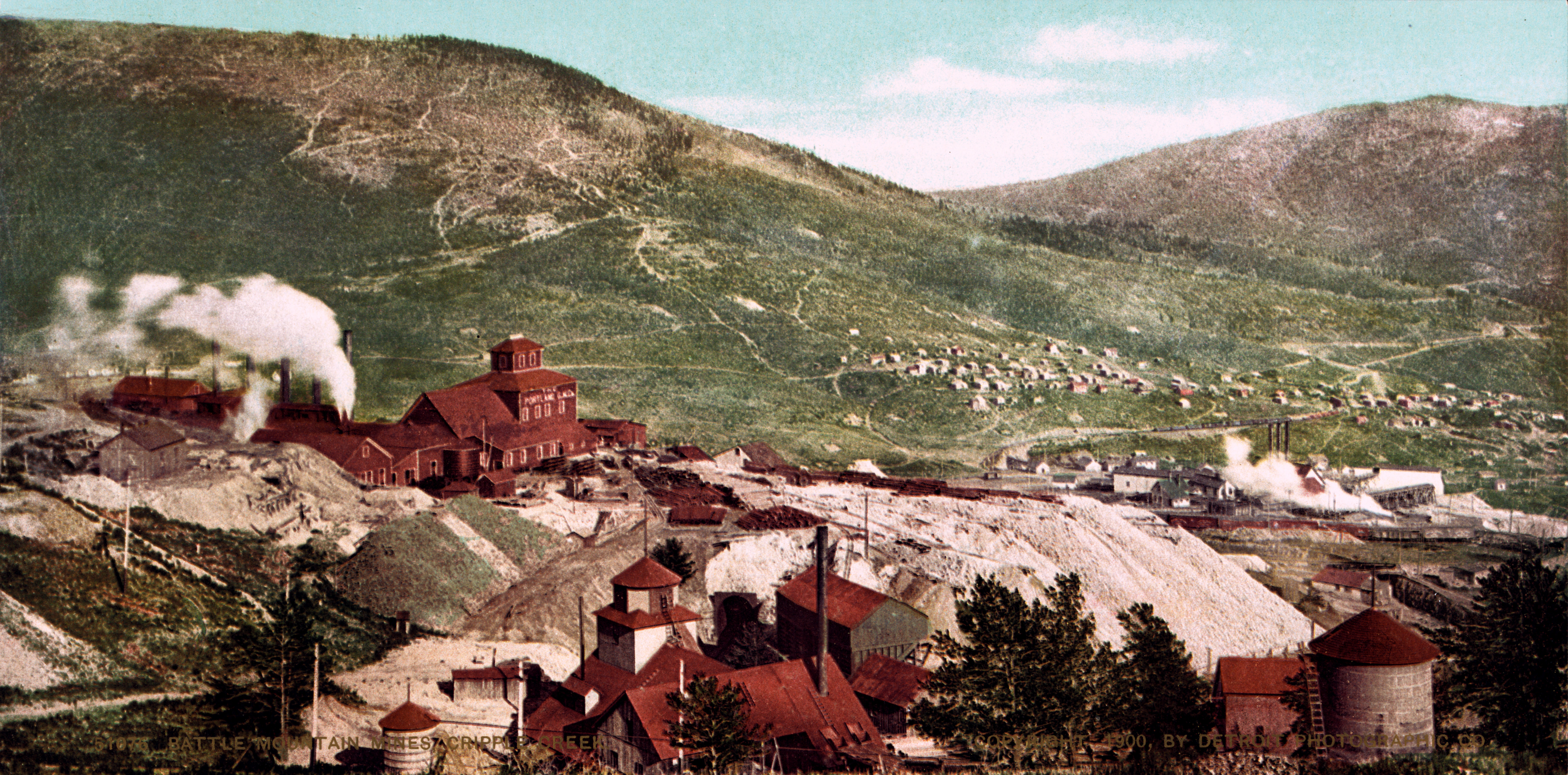
Battle Mountain mines, Cripple Creek, in 1898

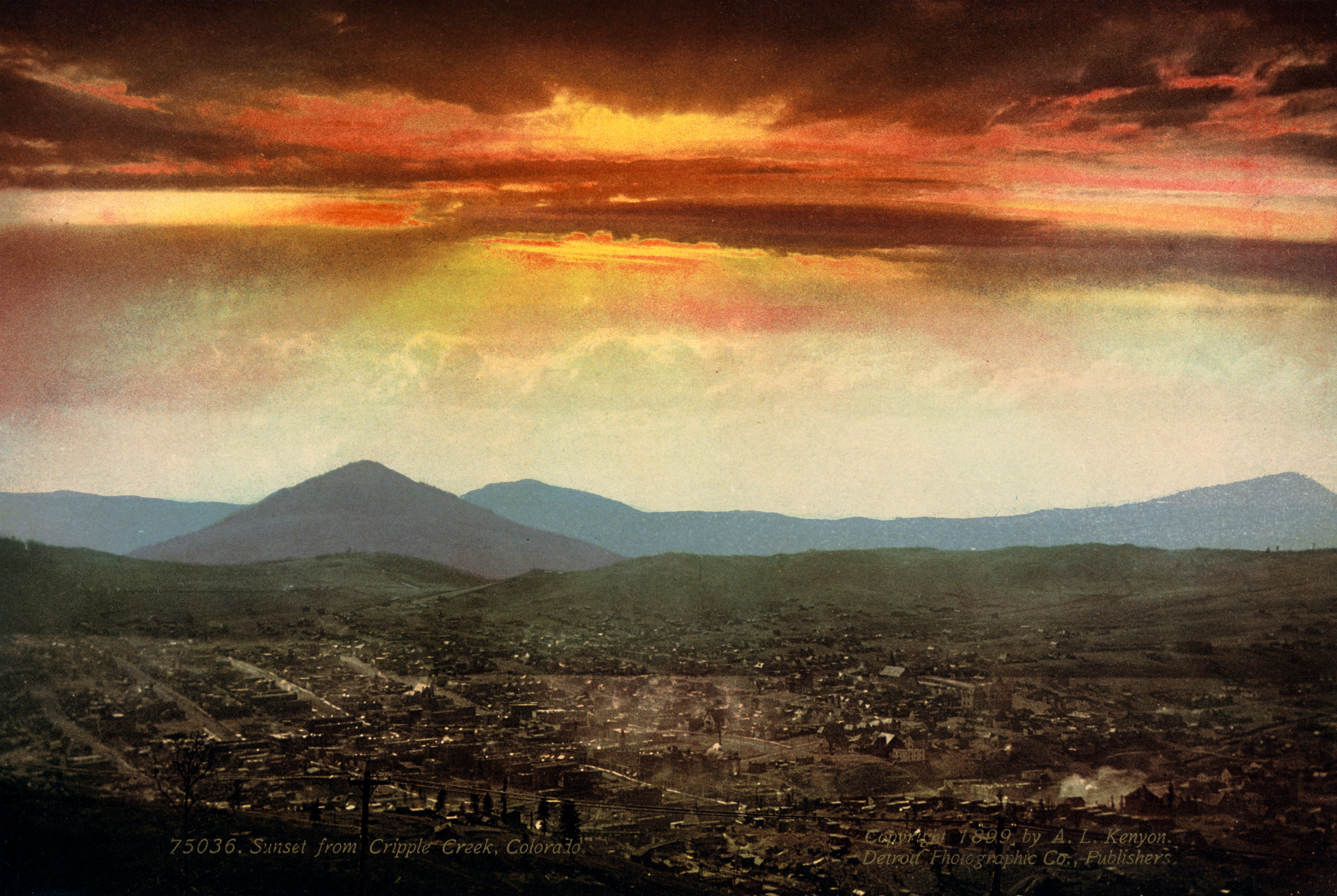
Sunset in Cripple Creek in 1899 with Mt. Pisgah – the conical peak at left

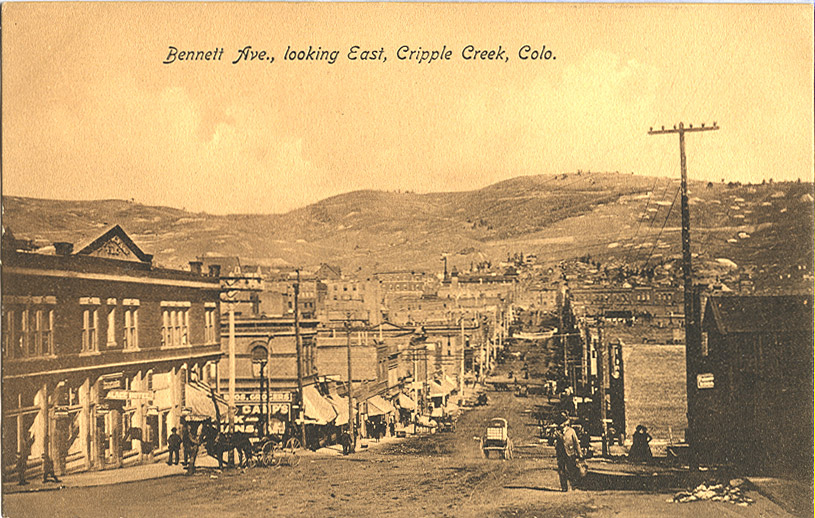
Looking east on Bennett Avenue, early 20th century

For many years, Cripple Creek's high valley, at an elevation of 9,494 feet (2,894 m), was considered no more important than a cattle pasture. Many prospectors avoided the area after the Mount Pisgah hoax, a mini gold rush caused by salting (adding gold to worthless rock).

=== Discovery of ore and gold rush ===
On October 20, 1890, Robert Miller "Bob" Womack discovered a rich ore and the last great Colorado gold rush began. By July 1891, a post office was established. By November, hundreds of prospectors were camping in the area. Rather than investing in mines, Denver realtors Horace Bennett and Julius Myers sought wealth by platting 80 acres of land for a townsite which they named Fremont. The town consisted of 30 platted blocks containing 766 lots. Each lot sold for $25 and $50 for corner lots. Within a year, the lots value increased and sold for at least $250 each. Months later, investors from Colorado Springs platted 140 acres near Fremont and called their town Hayden Placer. Bennett and Myers filed another plat near the Broken Box Ranch and named it Cripple Creek. The towns’ combined population totalled 600-800 people by the end of 1891. In 1892, the Cripple Creek Mining District was created. The Town of Cripple Creek was incorporated on June 9, 1892, and the Cripple Creek, Colorado, post office opened on June 20, 1892. From 1892, Bennett and Myers oversaw the Fremont Electric Light and Power Company. The district's first telephone was established in 1893. Thousands of prospectors flocked to the district, and before long Winfield Scott Stratton located the famous Independence lode, one of the largest gold strikes in history. In three years, the population increased from five hundred to ten thousand. The Palace Hotel and the Windsor Hotel were so full that chairs were rented out to be slept on for $1 a night. Although $500 million worth of gold ore was dug from Cripple Creek and more than 30 millionaires were produced since its mining heyday, Womack was not among them. Having sold his claim for $500 and a case of whiskey, he died penniless on August 10, 1909. By 1892, Cripple Creek was home to 5,000 people with another 5,000 in the nearby towns of Victor, Elton, Goldfield, Independence, Alton, and Strong. As people arrived, the marshal greeted them and confiscated their firearms, which were then sold in Denver to pay for the salary of the teachers of Cripple Creek.

In 1896, Cripple Creek suffered two disastrous fires. The first occurred on April 25 with flames resulting from a dispute between a bartender, Otto Floto, and his dancehall girlfriend, Jennie LaRue, on the second floor of the Central Dance Hall on Myers Avenue. Their struggle resulted in an oil lamp being thrown setting fire to the curtains. The fire incinerated most buildings on Myers Avenue before it was put out. Four days later, another fire destroyed much of the remaining half. A cook at the Portland Hotel spilled a kettle of grease on a hot stove, which caused fire to travel from Myers to Bennet Avenue and burned 1/3 of Cripple Creek. The town was rebuilt using brick and better construction methods in a period of a few months; most historic buildings today date back to 1896.

=== 1899 ===
On March 23, 1899, Teller County was created from portions of El Paso and Fremont counties with Cripple Creek as the county seat. By 1900, the Cripple Creek mining district was home to 500 mines. By 1910, it had produced 22.4 million ounces of gold. Between 1894 and 1902, around 50,000 people lived in the mining district with 35,000 in the town of Cripple Creek alone making it the fourth most populous town in Colorado at the time. The seven adjoining boom towns includes Victor, Gillette, Alban, Independence, Goldfield, Elton, and Cameron—all of which were connected by rail. During the boom, there were 150 saloons, 49 grocery stores, 25 restaurants, four department stores, 12 casinos, 34 churches, a business college, a county school district with 19 schools and 118 teachers educating almost 4,000 students, 90 doctors, 40 stockbrokers, 15 newspapers, 9 assay offices, 10 barber shops, 72 lawyers, 20 houses of ill-repute, over 300 prostitutes, 26 one room cribs, and several opium dens. Prostitution flourished until the 1920s and was taxed at a rate of $6 a month per prostitute and $16 a month per madame. Pearl De Vere, a famous madame who owned The Old Homestead, a high class brothel that serviced wealthy mine owners and entrepreneurs of the area, was known to have charged clients in the upwards of $250 a night. Over 8,000 miners worked in the district making $3 per day. Most miners and foremen supplemented their incomes by as much as 1/3 through high grading. It was estimated that an average of $1–2 million dollars per year were stolen from the early mines through high grading.

=== Labor strife ===
While $3 a day was typical for a miner, some miners had to work 8 hours a day while others had to work 9 or 10 hours. The average miners paid $1.75 per week for an unfurnished house or $2.50 per week to boarding houses that included a room, bath, and meals. During the 1890s, many of the miners in the Cripple Creek area joined a miners' union, the Western Federation of Miners (WFM). A significant strike took place in 1894, marking one of the few times in history that a sitting governor called out the national guard to protect miners from anti-union violence by forces under the control of the mine owners. By 1903, the allegiance of the state government had shifted, and Governor James Peabody sent the Colorado National Guard into Cripple Creek with the goal of destroying union power in the gold camps. The WFM strike of 1903 and the governor's response precipitated the Colorado Labor Wars, a struggle that took many lives.

The 1904 silent film short, Tracked by Bloodhounds; or, A Lynching at Cripple Creek, directed by Harry Buckwalter, was filmed in the area.

=== Late 20th, early 21st century ===
Through 2005, the Cripple Creek district produced about 23.5 million troy ounces (979 1/6 troy tons; 731 metric tons) of gold. The underground mines are mostly idle, except for a few small operations. There are significant underground deposits remaining which may become feasible to mine in the future. Large scale open pit mining and cyanide heap leach extraction of near-surface ore material, left behind by the old time miners as low grade, has taken place since 1994 east of Cripple Creek, near its sister city of Victor, Colorado. The district's population began declining starting in 1905 as mines began closing. By 1920, only 40 mines were in business, and by 1945 the number dwindled to just 20 mines.

The current mining operation is conducted by Cripple Creek & Victor Gold Mining Company (CC&V), run currently by Newmont Mining. The mine operates 24 hours a day, 365 days a year. Mine operations, maintenance, and processing departments work a rotating day/night schedule in 12-hour shifts.

With many empty storefronts and picturesque homes, Cripple Creek once drew interest as a ghost town. At one point, the population dropped to a few hundred, although Cripple Creek was never entirely deserted. In the 1970s and 1980s, travelers on photo safari might find themselves in a beautiful decaying historic town. A few restaurants and bars catered to tourists, who could pass weathered empty homes with lace curtains hanging in broken windows.

Colorado voters allowed Cripple Creek to establish legalized gambling in 1991. Cripple Creek is currently more of a gambling and tourist town than a ghost town. Casinos now occupy many historic buildings. Casino gambling has been successful in bringing revenue and vitality back into the area. It also provides funding for the State Historical Fund, administered by the Colorado Office of Archaeology and Historic Preservation. In 2012, Colorado casinos produced over $104 million in tax revenue for these programs.

== Geography ==
The gold-bearing area of the Cripple Creek district was the core of an ancient volcano within the central Colorado volcanic field, last active over 30 million years ago during the Oligocene. Free or native gold was found near the surface but at depth unoxidized gold tellurides and sulfides were found.

At the 2020 United States census, the town had a total area of 974 acres (3.941 km^{2}), all of it land.

The community takes its name from nearby Cripple Creek.

=== Climate ===
Climate data for Cripple Creek 3NNW, Colorado, 1991–2020 normals: 9235ft (2815m)
Month	Jan	Feb	Mar	Apr	May	Jun	Jul	Aug	Sep	Oct	Nov	Dec	Year
Record high °F (°C)	55 (13)	56 (13)	66 (19)	68 (20)	78 (26)	87 (31)	86 (30)	85 (29)	83 (28)	74 (23)	63 (17)	57 (14)	87 (31)
Mean maximum °F (°C)	49.4 (9.7)	49.5 (9.7)	58.7 (14.8)	64.1 (17.8)	71.5 (21.9)	82.9 (28.3)	83.7 (28.7)	80.0 (26.7)	77.2 (25.1)	69.3 (20.7)	58.7 (14.8)	50.4 (10.2)	82.9 (28.3)
Mean daily maximum °F (°C)	34.3 (1.3)	36.1 (2.3)	43.2 (6.2)	48.9 (9.4)	59.3 (15.2)	71.2 (21.8)	75.7 (24.3)	72.3 (22.4)	66.8 (19.3)	54.9 (12.7)	42.5 (5.8)	34.3 (1.3)	53.3 (11.8)
Daily mean °F (°C)	24.3 (−4.3)	25.3 (−3.7)	32.1 (0.1)	37.4 (3.0)	46.7 (8.2)	57.8 (14.3)	62.3 (16.8)	59.7 (15.4)	54.0 (12.2)	42.7 (5.9)	32.7 (0.4)	24.4 (−4.2)	41.6 (5.3)
Mean daily minimum °F (°C)	14.4 (−9.8)	14.6 (−9.7)	21.0 (−6.1)	25.9 (−3.4)	34.1 (1.2)	44.4 (6.9)	48.9 (9.4)	47.1 (8.4)	41.1 (5.1)	30.4 (−0.9)	22.8 (−5.1)	14.4 (−9.8)	29.9 (−1.1)
Mean minimum °F (°C)	−3.0 (−19.4)	−4.1 (−20.1)	3.0 (−16.1)	9.7 (−12.4)	18.9 (−7.3)	33.2 (0.7)	42.8 (6.0)	40.5 (4.7)	28.8 (−1.8)	12.6 (−10.8)	5.3 (−14.8)	−5.9 (−21.1)	−10.3 (−23.5)
Record low °F (°C)	−11 (−24)	−22 (−30)	−3 (−19)	−3 (−19)	8 (−13)	26 (−3)	38 (3)	37 (3)	18 (−8)	−7 (−22)	−14 (−26)	−16 (−27)	−22 (−30)
Average precipitation inches (mm)	0.51 (13)	0.55 (14)	1.31 (33)	1.67 (42)	1.81 (46)	1.77 (45)	3.20 (81)	3.43 (87)	1.71 (43)	0.89 (23)	0.57 (14)	0.56 (14)	17.98 (455)
Average snowfall inches (cm)	7.7 (20)	11.3 (29)	11.3 (29)	14.6 (37)	8.1 (21)	0.5 (1.3)	0.0 (0.0)	0.2 (0.51)	1.5 (3.8)	8.7 (22)	7.1 (18)	11.3 (29)	82.3 (210.61)
Source 1: NOAA
Source 2: XMACIS (2006-2020 snowfall, records & monthly max/mins)

== Demographics ==
Historical population
Census	Pop.	Note	%±
1900	10,147		—
1910	6,206		−38.8%
1920	2,325		−62.5%
1930	1,427		−38.6%
1940	2,358		65.2%
1950	853		−63.8%
1960	614		−28.0%
1970	425		−30.8%
1980	655		54.1%
1990	584		−10.8%
2000	1,115		90.9%
2010	1,189		6.6%
2020	1,155		−2.9%
U.S. Decennial Census

In the early years, miners arrived without their families to seek their fortunes. Once settled, their families joined them leading the district's population to balloon. Over 1/3 of the district's citizens were White and Catholic. Swedes were a large enough ethnic group to have established their own newspaper, Svenska Posten. Hundreds of French people lived in the district and owned many businesses. A small population of Chinese and African Americans secured employment in the laundry business and as porters in saloons. The Chinese were not allowed to work on mines and only a handful of African Americans were hired as miners. A good mix of Irish, French, German, African Americans and Chinese women worked as prostitutes.

=== 2020 census ===
As of the 2020 census, Cripple Creek had a population of 1,155. The median age was 47.8 years. 14.2% of residents were under the age of 18 and 23.4% of residents were 65 years of age or older. For every 100 females there were 113.1 males, and for every 100 females age 18 and over there were 111.3 males age 18 and over.

0.0% of residents lived in urban areas, while 100.0% lived in rural areas.

There were 530 households in Cripple Creek, of which 24.2% had children under the age of 18 living in them. Of all households, 32.1% were married-couple households, 32.1% were households with a male householder and no spouse or partner present, and 28.1% were households with a female householder and no spouse or partner present. About 35.3% of all households were made up of individuals and 13.9% had someone living alone who was 65 years of age or older.

There were 698 housing units, of which 24.1% were vacant. The homeowner vacancy rate was 1.4% and the rental vacancy rate was 12.8%.

Racial composition as of the 2020 census
Race	Number	Percent
White	992	85.9%
Black or African American	13	1.1%
American Indian and Alaska Native	11	1.0%
Asian	9	0.8%
Native Hawaiian and Other Pacific Islander	0	0.0%
Some other race	15	1.3%
Two or more races	115	10.0%
Hispanic or Latino (of any race)	87	7.5%

=== 2000 census ===
As of the census of 2000, there were 1,115 people, 494 households, and 282 families residing in the city. The population density was 988.7 inhabitants per square mile (381.7/km^{2}). There were 737 housing units at an average density of 653.5 per square mile (252.3/km^{2}). The racial makeup of the city was 92.29% White, 0.90% African American, 2.15% Native American, 0.81% Asian, 1.43% from other races, and 2.42% from two or more races. 6.01% of the population were Hispanic or Latino of any race.

There were 494 households, out of which 23.3% had children under the age of 18 living with them, 44.7% were married couples living together, 7.9% had a female householder with no husband present, and 42.9% were non-families. 30.4% of all households were made up of individuals, and 4.9% had someone living alone who was 65 years of age or older. The average household size was 2.26 and the average family size was 2.82.

In the city, the population was spread out, with 22.2% under the age of 18, 10.4% from 18 to 24, 29.2% from 25 to 44, 30.2% from 45 to 64, and 8.0% who were 65 years of age or older. The median age was 39 years. For every 100 females, there were 104.2 males. For every 100 females age 18 and over, there were 100.0 males.

The median income for a household in the city was $39,261, and the median income for a family was $41,685. Males had a median income of $27,600 versus $25,000 for females. The per capita income for the city was $19,607. About 4.7% of families and 6.4% of the population were below the poverty line, including 3.8% of those under age 18 and 6.1% of those age 65 or over.

== Arts and culture ==
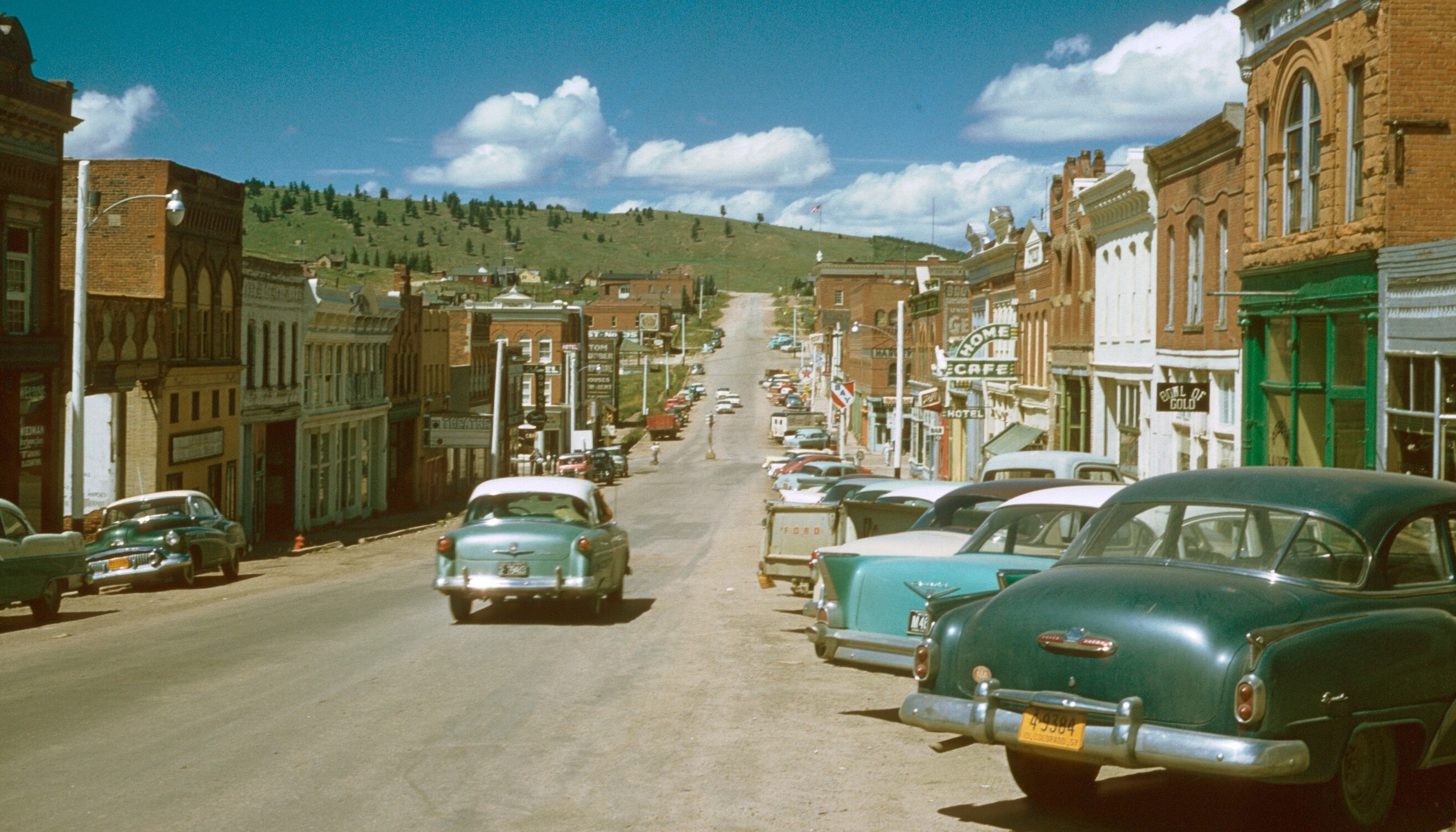
Cripple Creek, 1957

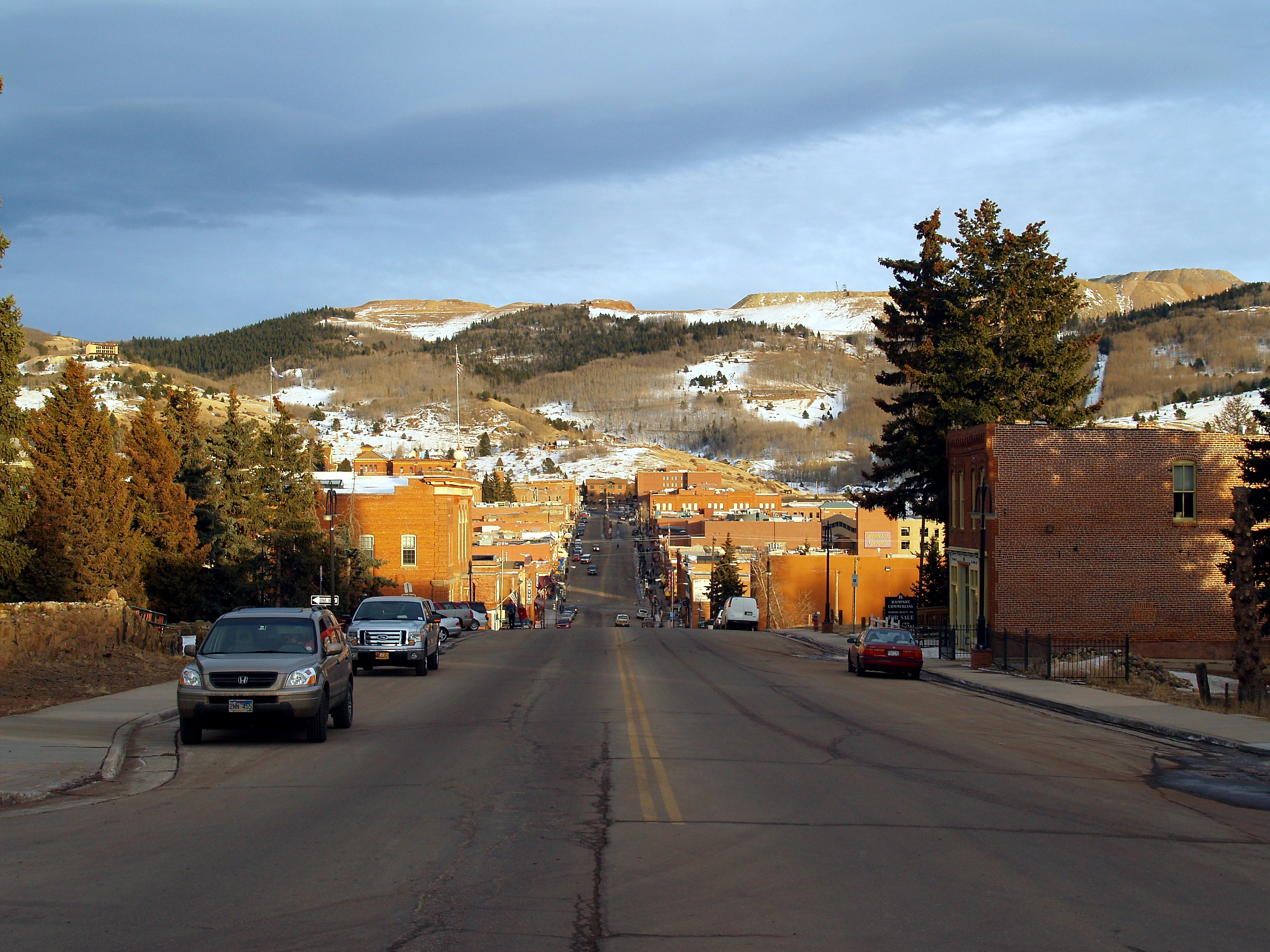
Downtown Cripple Creek in January 2009.

The Cripple Creek and Victor Narrow Gauge Railroad, a narrow gauge train ride from Cripple Creek passes several small ghost towns, goldmines, and glory holes. The Mollie Kathleen Gold Mine provides tours into a real gold mine led by a real gold miner.

In 2006 Cripple Creek broke ground on the new Pikes Peak Heritage Center. Constructed at a cost over $2.5 million, the building is over 11,000 square feet (1,000 m^{2}) of educational displays. State of the art electronics are used throughout the building and there is also a theatre showing historical films about the area. Newly named the Cripple Creek Heritage Center, admission is free.

Cripple Creek is also home to the Butte Opera House, a theatre first managed by the Mackin family (previous owners of the Imperial Hotel and producers of a long-running, much-loved melodrama theatre company). The Butte is currently the home of the Mountain Rep Theatre Company that produces plays, musicals, and classic melodramas year-round, including such shows as Forever Plaid, Hot Night in the Old Town, A Cripple Creek Christmas Carol, The Rocky Horror Show, and The Christmas Donkey.

Cripple Creek features many events throughout the year like the Cripple Creek Ice Festival, Donkey Derby Days, the July 4 Celebration, the annual Ice Castles and a Gold Camp Christmas.

== Education ==
Cripple Creek is served by the Cripple Creek-Victor School District RE-1. The district has one elementary school and one junior/senior high school, including Cresson Elementary School and Cripple Creek-Victor Junior/Senior High School. Principal of the Jr/Sr High School is Daniel Cummings and Miriam Mondragon is the Superintendent of Schools.

== See also ==
- Cripple Creek and Victor Narrow Gauge Railroad
- Gold Belt Tour National Scenic and Historic Byway
- Pearl de Vere, known as the "soiled dove of Cripple Creek"
