= Ute Pass =

Mountain pass in Colorado, USA

- Location within Colorado
- Elevation: 9,165 ft (2,793 m)
- Traversed by: US 24

Third Approach
- Location: Teller County, Colorado; United States
- Range: Front Range
- Coordinates: 38°56′30″N 105°09′25″W
- Topo map: USGS Divide

The Ute Pass /ˈjuːt/ is a mountain pass west of Colorado Springs that ranges from a peak elevation at Divide of 9,165 to 6,165 feet (2,793 to 1,879 m) at its lowest point.

== Geology ==
About 75,000 years ago glaciers moved down the sides of what became Pikes Peak. Over time, the ground also thrusted upward. The combination of the change in terrain from the moving tectonic plates and the sculpting of rock due to the moving boulders created the steep canyons of the Ute Pass entrance. From the entrance of Ute Pass at Manitou Springs and for about 5 miles, the terrain is steep canyon land and the road has many curves. The terrain becomes less steep, eventually becoming "gentle u-shaped valleys" near the summit at Divide.

== Geography ==
Ute Pass is located west of Colorado Springs, to the north of Pikes Peak and is located along U.S. Highway 24. From west to east, the pass traverses through Divide, Woodland Park, Green Mountain Falls, Chipita Park and Cascade. Its waters collect through the mountains of Ute Pass, through Fountain Creek canyon west of Manitou Springs and collect in Fountain Creek.

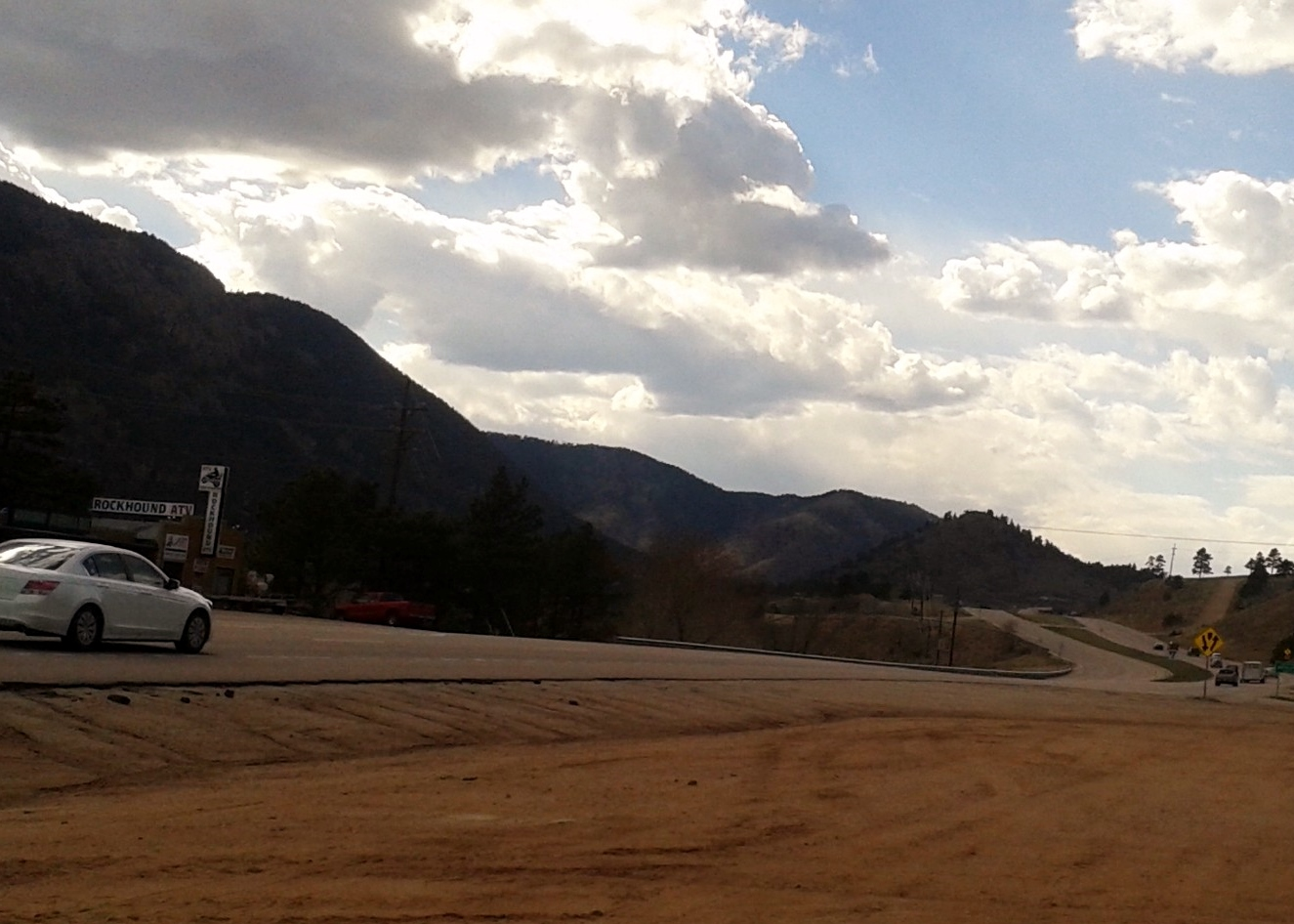
Ute Pass between Cascade and Woodland Park

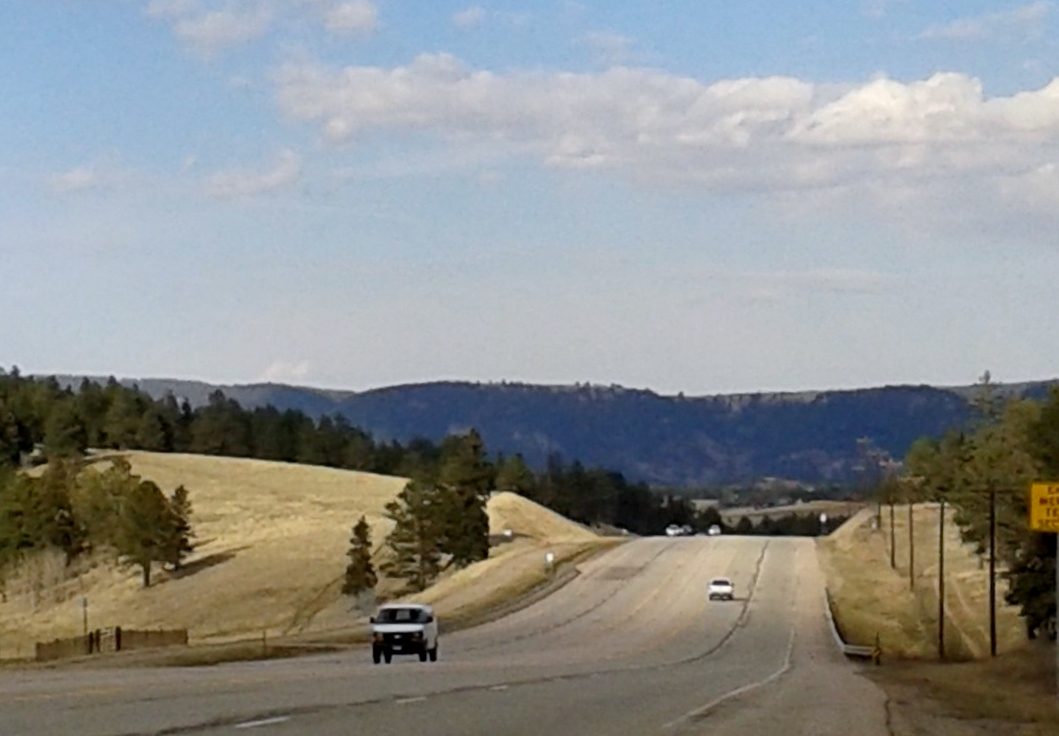
Ute Pass west of Woodland Park

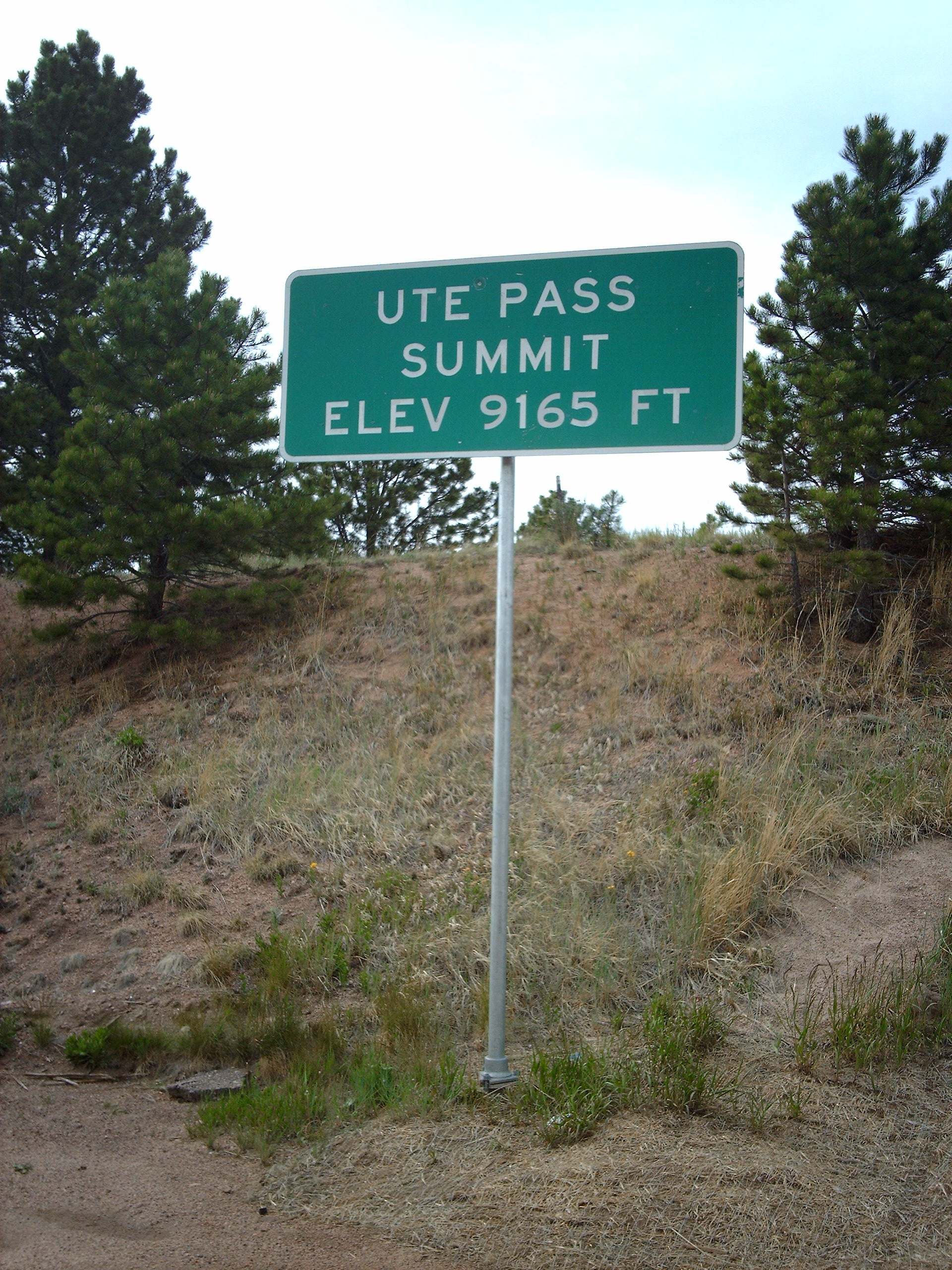
Ute Pass Summit sign

== History ==
Ute Trail, which runs along the north side of Pikes Peak is believed to have first been a buffalo trail that delivered buffalo from the "milder winter pastures of the eastern plains" to the "lush, grassy" meadows of South Park, Colorado during the summer months. Joel Palmer wrote in his 1847 Journal of Travels over the Rocky Mountains: "These (buffalo) paths are remarkable in their appearance, being about 15 inches wide, and four inches deep, and worn into the soil as smoothly as they could be cut with a spade."

Stephen Harriman Long wrote of his 1820s travel through the Pikes Peak region that Ute Trail was used by bison and Native Americans. For the Utes, the trail and pass was used to transport salt from Bayou Salade, the salt valley of South Park, to Santa Fe and Taos for trade. The Ute's name for the pass was El Puerto del Sierra Almagre, which means "Doorway to the Red Earth Mountains".

Ute Trail became a wagon road in the 1860s providing transport to Leadville mining camp. In 1872 the old wagon road through Ute Pass started at Rainbow Falls, or Ute Pass Falls. The Colorado Midland Railway had tracks through the Ute Pass to Leadville and Aspen beginning in 1888. Service was later extended to Cripple Creek. Once the mining industry declined, the railroad tracks were removed.

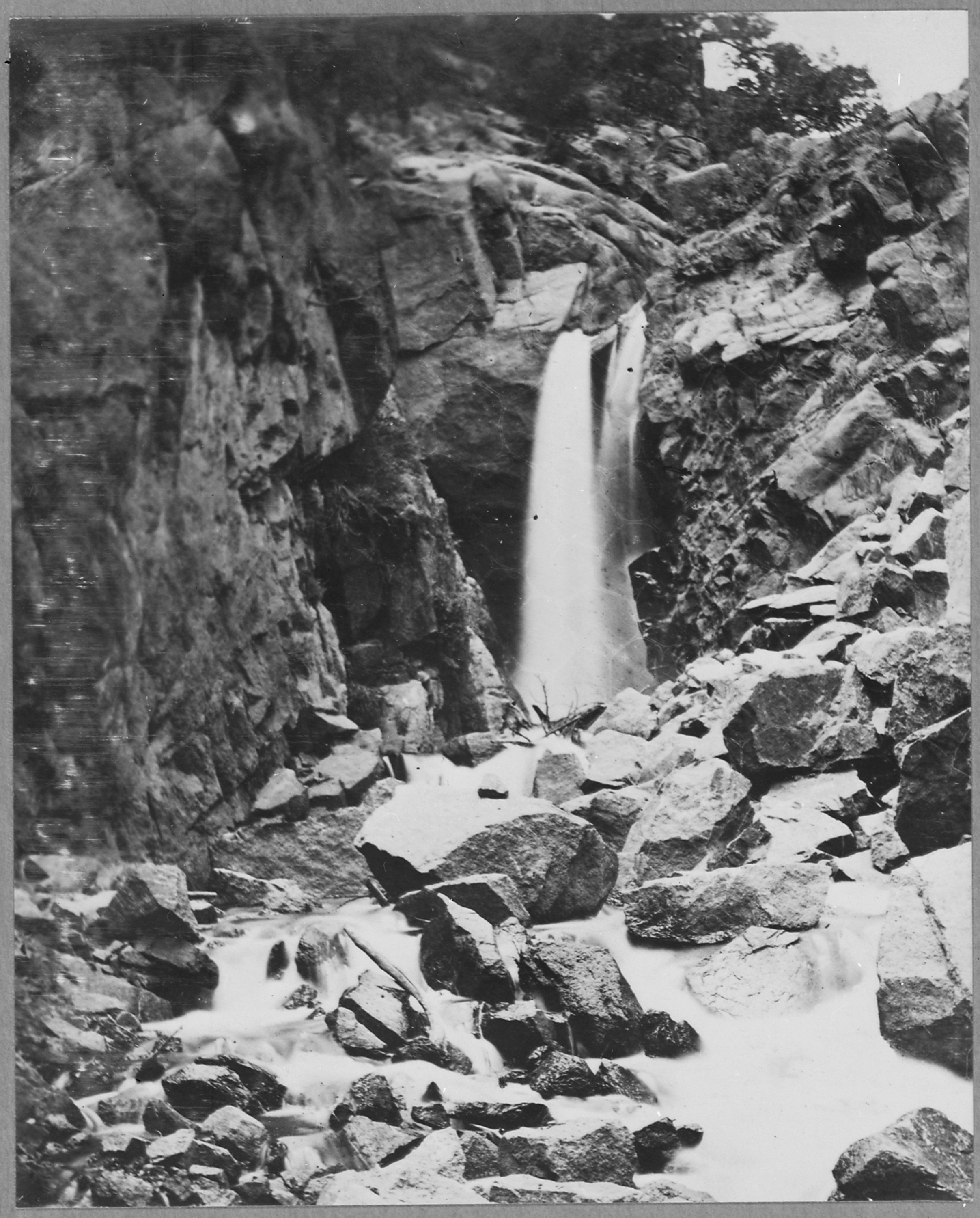
Ute Falls in Ute Pass, by William Henry Jackson, 1873, Department of the Interior.

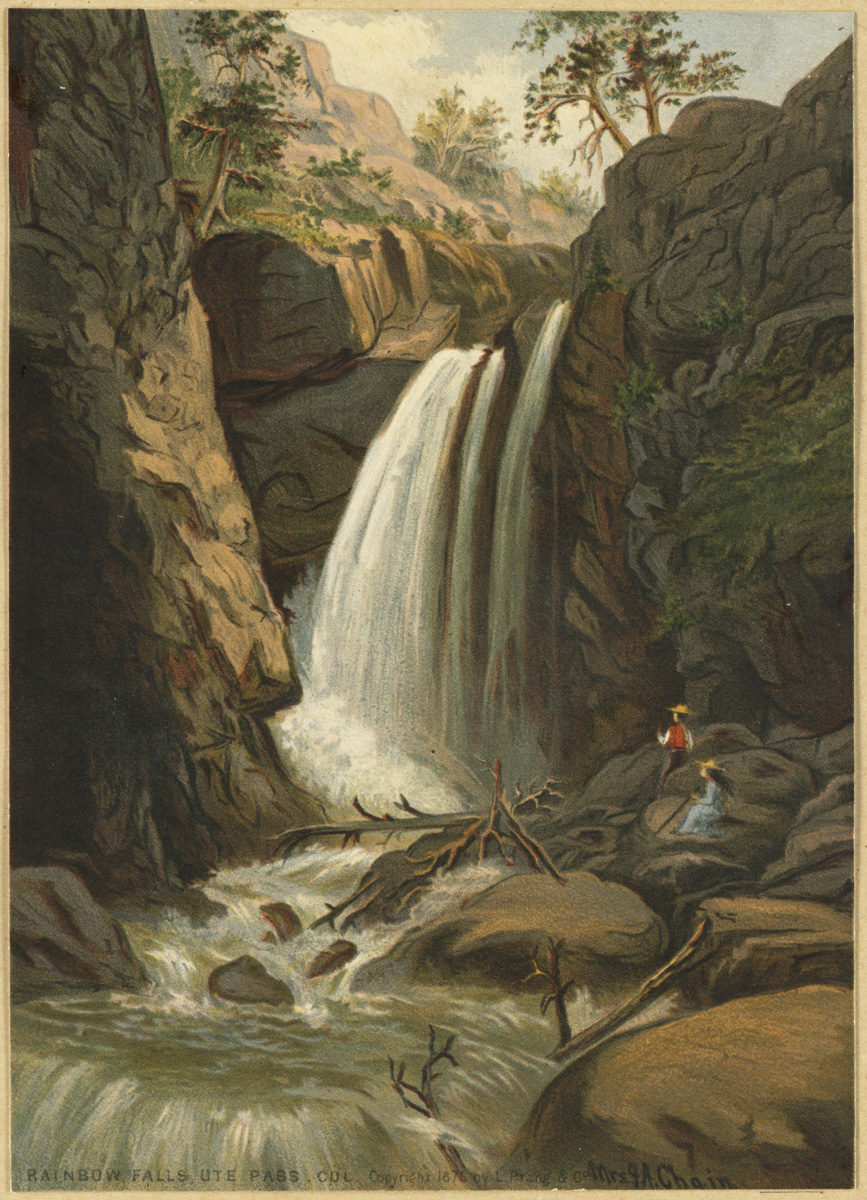
Rainbow Falls, Ute Pass, by Helen Henderson, 1878, Boston Public Library, Print Department

In 1932 a new road was built that better accommodated automotive vehicles. Ute Pass is now along U.S. Highway 24, a four-lane highway, which partially obscured Rainbow Falls. Tourism began to be a major economic force in the late 19th century and towns along Ute Pass built cabins and hotels as a result.

The pass at one time was used by stage coach and equestrian traffic. It is steep (7%) on the east side.

== Ecological system ==
The climate is arid, so many plants that grow here are adapted to low water usage.

Wildlife in the Ute Pass area includes wild turkey, mule deer, mountain lion, bighorn sheep, moose, and especially during the summer and fall, black bear.

== Ute Pass History Park ==
Ute Pass History Park is located at 231 E. Henrietta Avenue on the north side of Woodland Park.

The Pikes Peak Museum comprises six buildings that tell the history of the pass, people who traversed it, and the communities founded along the pass. The buildings include the museum center, four cabins and a jailhouse, with exhibits that convey the lifestyle, industries, transportation, and communities along Ute Pass. Its exhibits includes information about the Ute people and early pioneers.

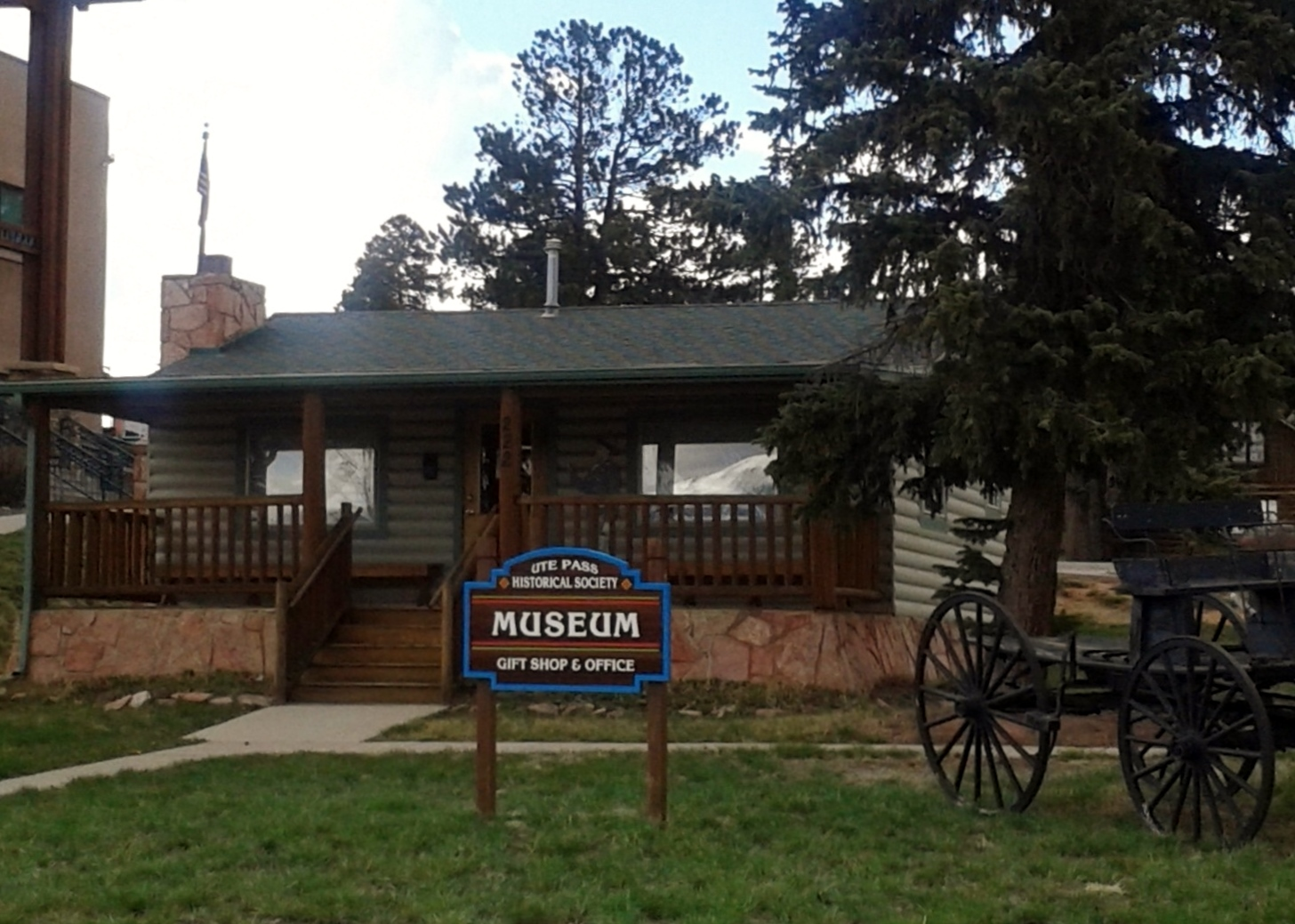

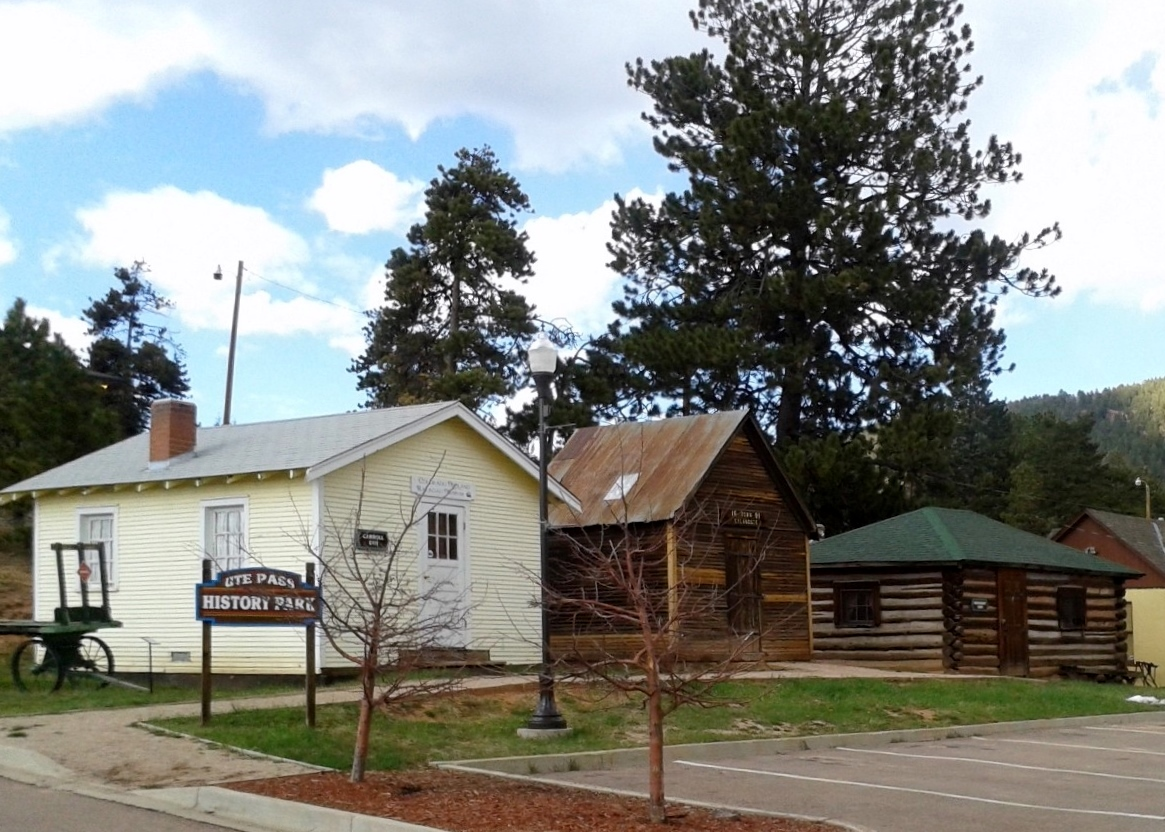

== See also ==
- Colorado mountain passes
