= U.S. Route 24 in Colorado =

Section of U.S. Numbered Highway in Colorado, United States

U.S. Highway 24
- US 24 highlighted in red

Route information
- Maintained by CDOT
- Length: 327.179 mi (526.544 km)
- Existed: 1936–present

Major junctions
- West end: I-70 / US 6 in Minturn
- US 285 in Buena Vista; I-25 / US 85 / US 87 in Colorado Springs; I-70 / US 40 / US 287 in Limon; US 385 in Burlington; I-70 from Burlington to the Kansas state line
- East end: I-70 / US-24 in Kanorado, KS

Location
- Country: United States
- State: Colorado
- Counties: Eagle, Lake, Chaffee, Park, Teller, El Paso, Elbert, Lincoln, Kit Carson

Highway system
- United States Numbered Highway System; List; Special; Divided; Colorado State Highway System; Interstate; US; State; Scenic
← SH 23	→ I-25

U.S. Highway 24 (US 24) is a part of the United States Numbered Highway System that travels from Minturn, Colorado, to Clarkston, Michigan. In the U.S. state of Colorado, US 24 extends from Interstate 70 (I-70) and US 6 in Minturn east to the Kansas state line where it continues as US 24 concurrent with I-70.

== Route description ==
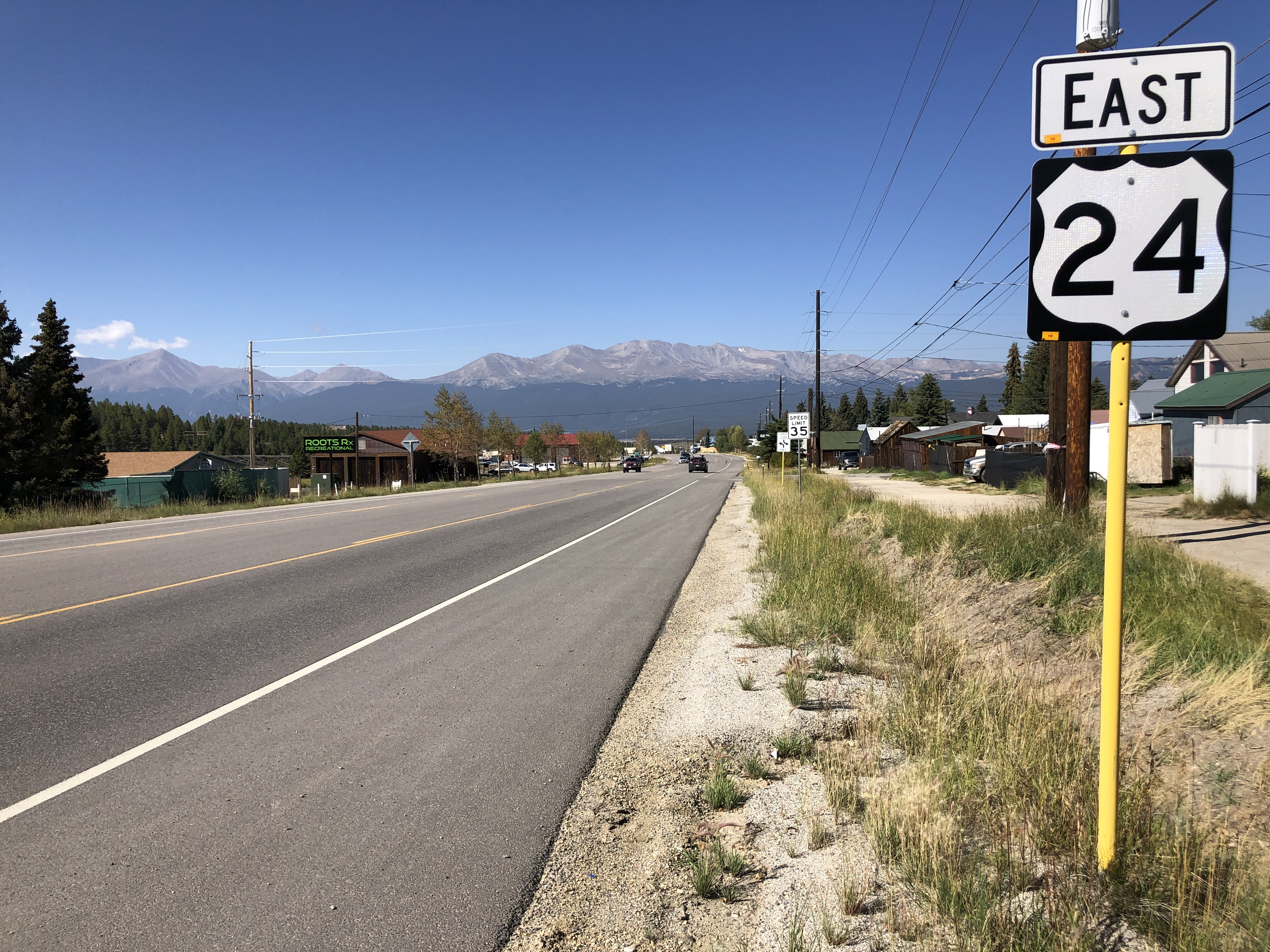
US 24 leaving Leadville

US 24 traverses the Rocky Mountains, starting near Minturn. It then continues southeast for about 30 miles (48 km) to Leadville, where it turns south and goes to Buena Vista where it becomes concurrent with US 285. It continues with US 285 through Trout Creek Pass to the small community of Antero Junction. After that, it spends its time as a mountainous two-lane highway through the high-altitude South Park basin until it gets to the town of Divide, where it meets State Highway 67 (SH 67) and becomes a four-lane highway. These highways overlap to Woodland Park. From there, it passes through Crystola, Green Mountain Falls, and Cascade. Through Manitou Springs and Colorado Springs, where the road is known as Midland Expressway. Just east of I-25, it is known as the Martin Luther King Jr Bypass. From Colorado Springs, it continues northeast through several towns such as Falcon, Peyton, Calhan, Ramah, Simla, and Matheson. When US 24 reaches Limon, it junctions with I-70/US 40/US 287/SH 71. It continues east (parallel to I-70) to Burlington where it joins I-70 to the Kansas state line.

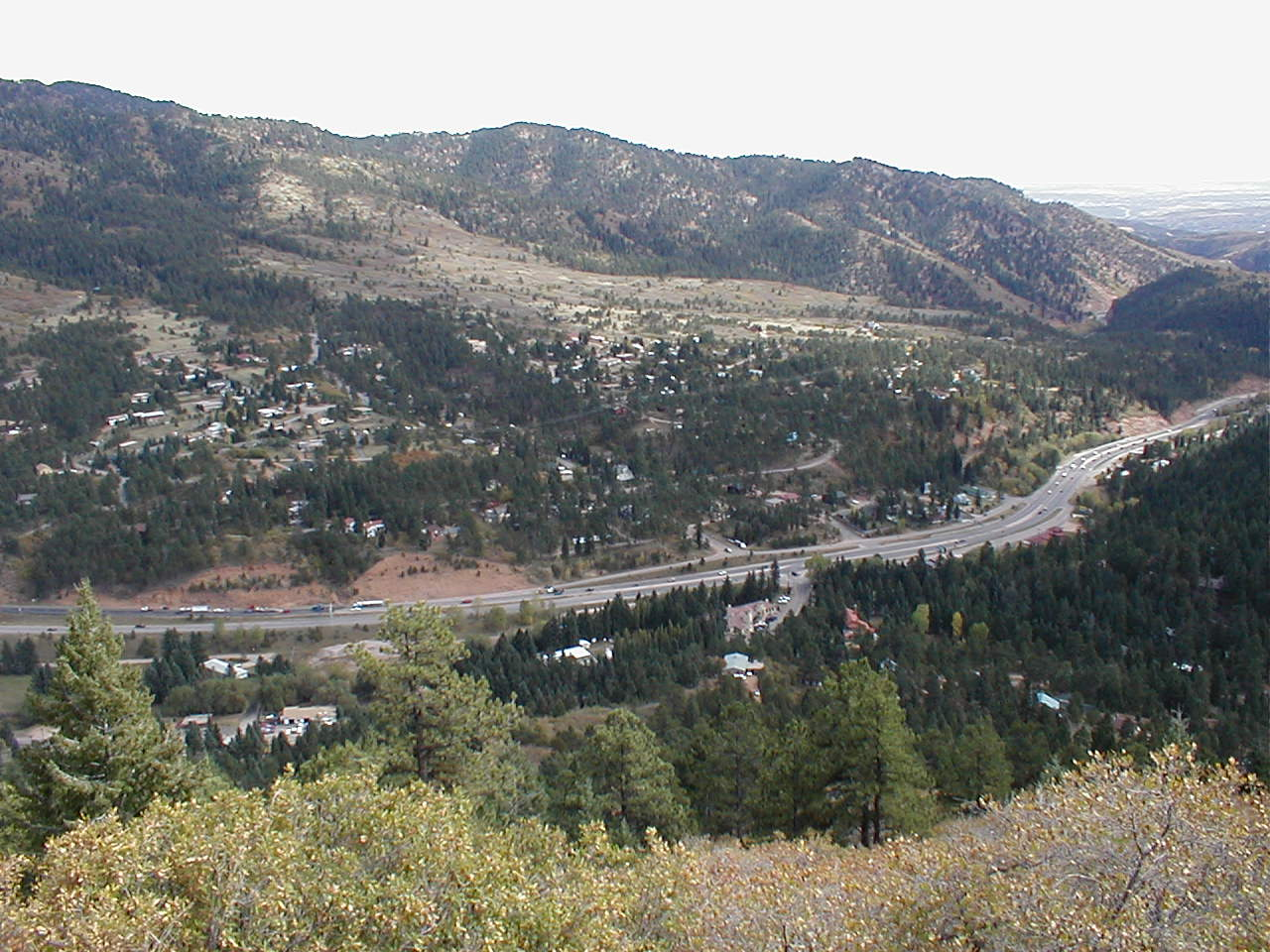
US 24 at Cascade, viewed from Pikes Peak Highway, October 2001

== Junction list ==
County	Location	mi	km	Exit	Destinations	Notes
Eagle	Minturn	143.400	230.780		I-70 / US 6 – Denver, Grand Junction	Western terminus of US 24; I-70 exit 171
Lake	Leadville	174.649	281.070		SH 91 north	
Lake		180.097	289.838		SH 300 west – Leadville National Fish Hatchery	
Lake		191.186	307.684		SH 82 west – Aspen	
Chaffee	Johnson Village	212.900	342.629		US 285 south – Poncha Springs	Southern end of US 285 overlap
Park		223.671– 226.550	359.964– 364.597		US 285 north – Fairplay	Northern end of US 285 overlap
Park	Hartsel	238.236	383.404		SH 9 north – Fairplay	Western end of SH 9 overlap
Park	Hartsel	239.320	385.148		SH 9 south – Cañon City	Eastern end of SH 9 overlap
Teller	Divide	278.110	447.575		SH 67 south – Cripple Creek, Victor	Western end of SH 67 overlap; Ute Pass summit
Teller	Woodland Park	284.822	458.377		SH 67 north – Deckers	Eastern end of SH 67 overlap
Teller		293.826	472.867		Pikes Peak Highway	
El Paso	Manitou Springs	296.970	477.927	297	US 24 Bus. east (Manitou Avenue) – Manitou Springs	Interchange; eastbound exit and westbound entrance
El Paso	Manitou Springs	299.063	481.295	299	US 24 Bus. west (Manitou Avenue)	Interchange
El Paso	Colorado Springs	303.840	488.983	141	I-25 north – Denver	Western end of I-25 overlap; exit numbers follow I-25
El Paso	Colorado Springs	305.205	491.180	140	SH 115 south (Nevada Avenue) / Tejon Street	Northern terminus of SH-115
El Paso	Colorado Springs	306.467	493.211	304A	I-25 south – Pueblo	Eastern end of I-25 overlap; western end of US 24 freeway; I-25 exit 139
El Paso	Colorado Springs	307.336	494.609	304B	Union Boulevard	
El Paso	Colorado Springs	307.967	495.625	305	Circle Drive / Fountain Boulevard	Westbound exit and eastbound entrance; former SH 29; east end of freeway
El Paso	Colorado Springs	309.247	497.685		Academy Boulevard	Former SH 83
El Paso	Colorado Springs	310.857	500.276		SH 21 south (Powers Boulevard) – Colorado Springs Municipal Airport	Western end of SH 21 overlap
El Paso	Colorado Springs	312.137	502.336	140	Airport Road	Diverging-diamond interchange
El Paso	Colorado Springs	313.505	504.537		SH 21 north (Powers Boulevard) / Platte Avenue west – Downtown Colorado Springs	Eastern end of SH 21/Powers Blvd overlap; SH 21 Exit 141
El Paso	Colorado Springs	314.373	505.934	—	To SH 94 east / Peterson Bouelevard / Space Village Avenue – Peterson Space Force Base	Interchange
El Paso		315.057	507.035		SH 94 east – Schriever Space Force Base, Colorado Springs East Airport, Punkin Center	
El Paso		328.467	528.616		To SH 86 / Elbert Road – Elbert, Kiowa	
Elbert	No major junctions					
Lincoln	Limon	379.341	610.490		US 40 west / US 287 north to I-70 west – Denver	Western end of US 40/US 287 overlap
Lincoln	Limon	380.295	612.025		SH 71 south – Punkin Center	Western end of SH 71 overlap
Lincoln	Limon	381.422	613.839		SH 71 north – Last Chance	Eastern end of SH 71 overlap
Lincoln	Limon	381.820	614.480		I-70 – Denver, Burlington	I-70 exit 361
Lincoln		383.058	616.472	363	I-70 west / US 40 east / US 287 south – Denver, Kit Carson	Eastern end of US 40/US 287 overlap; western end of I-70 overlap
Lincoln		391.515	630.082	371	Genoa, Hugo	
Lincoln		396.553	638.190	376	Bovina	
Lincoln	Arriba	403.529	649.417	383	Arriba	
Kit Carson		414.597	667.229	395	Flagler	
Kit Carson	Seibert	425.395	684.607	405	I-70 east / SH 59 south – Burlington, Kit Carson	Eastern end of overlap of I-70; southern end of SH 59 overlap
Kit Carson	Seibert	425.846	685.333		SH 59 north – Yuma	Northern end of SH 59 overlap
Kit Carson	Stratton	440.339	708.657		SH 57 south	
Kit Carson	Burlington	457.967	737.026		US 385 south (Lincoln Street) – Cheyenne Wells	Western end of US 385 overlap
Kit Carson	Burlington	458.936	738.586		US 385 north – Wray	Eastern end of US 385 overlap
Kit Carson	Burlington	459.215	739.035	438	I-70 west – Limon	Western end of I-70 overlap
Kit Carson		470.579	757.323		I-70 east / US-24 east – Goodland, Salina	Continuation into Kansas
1.000 mi = 1.609 km; 1.000 km = 0.621 mi: Concurrency terminus; Incomplete access

== See also ==
- List of U.S. Highways in Colorado

U.S. Route 24
Previous state: Terminus	Colorado	Next state: Kansas
