= Midland, Colorado =

Census-designated place in Teller County, CO, USA

- Census-designated place
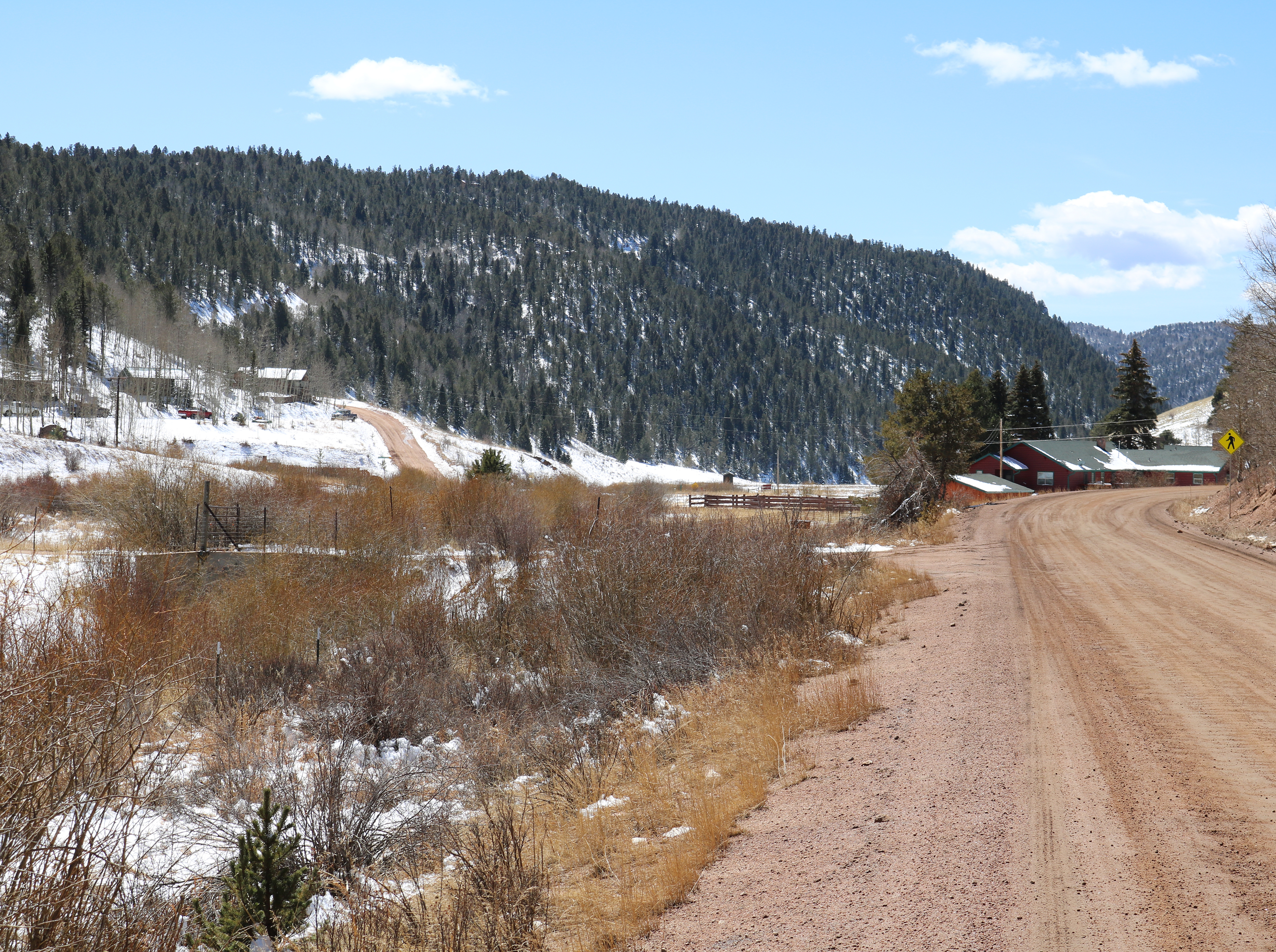
- Midland in 2022

- Location of the Midland CDP in Teller County, Colorado
- Coordinates: 38°50′49″N 105°09′28″W
- Country: United States
- State: Colorado
- County: Teller County
- Founded: 1893

Government
  - Type: unincorporated community

Area
  - Total: 1.739 sq mi (4.504 km^{2})
  - Land: 1.721 sq mi (4.458 km^{2})
  - Water: 0.018 sq mi (0.046 km^{2})
- Elevation: 9,407 ft (2,867 m)

Population (2020)
  - Total: 182
  - Density: 106/sq mi (40.8/km^{2})
- Time zone: UTC-7 (MST)
  - Summer (DST): UTC-6 (MDT)
- ZIP Code: Divide 80814
- Area code: 719
- GNIS feature ID: 2583266

Midland is an unincorporated community and a census-designated place (CDP) located in and governed by Teller County, Colorado, United States. The CDP is a part of the Colorado Springs, CO Metropolitan Statistical Area. The population of the Midland CDP was 182 at the United States Census 2020. The Divide post office (Zip Code 80814) serves the area.

== History ==
The Midland Terminal Railway maintained a station at Midland, midway between Divide and Cripple Creek.

== Geography ==
The Midland CDP has an area of 1,113 acres (4.504 km^{2}), including 11 acres (0.046 km^{2}) of water.

== Demographics ==
The United States Census Bureau initially defined the Midland CDP for the United States Census 2010.

Midland CDP, Colorado
Year	Pop.	±%
2010	156	—
2020	182	+16.7%
Source: United States Census Bureau

== Education ==
Midland CDP is divided between the two school districts covering sections of Teller County: Cripple Creek-Victor School District RE-1 and Woodland Park School District RE-2.

== See also ==
- Front Range Urban Corridor
- South Central Colorado Urban Area
