= Manitou Park Recreation Area, Colorado =

Recreation area in Teller County, Colorado

Coordinates: 39°5′49.28″N 105°5′44.14″W

The Manitou Park Recreation Area is a recreation area in the Pike National Forest, located 5.2 miles (8.4 km) north of Woodland Park along Colorado State Highway 67 in Teller County, Colorado. The recreation area includes several campgrounds and a picnic area, the Manitou Lake Picnic Area.

== Manitou Lake Picnic Area ==
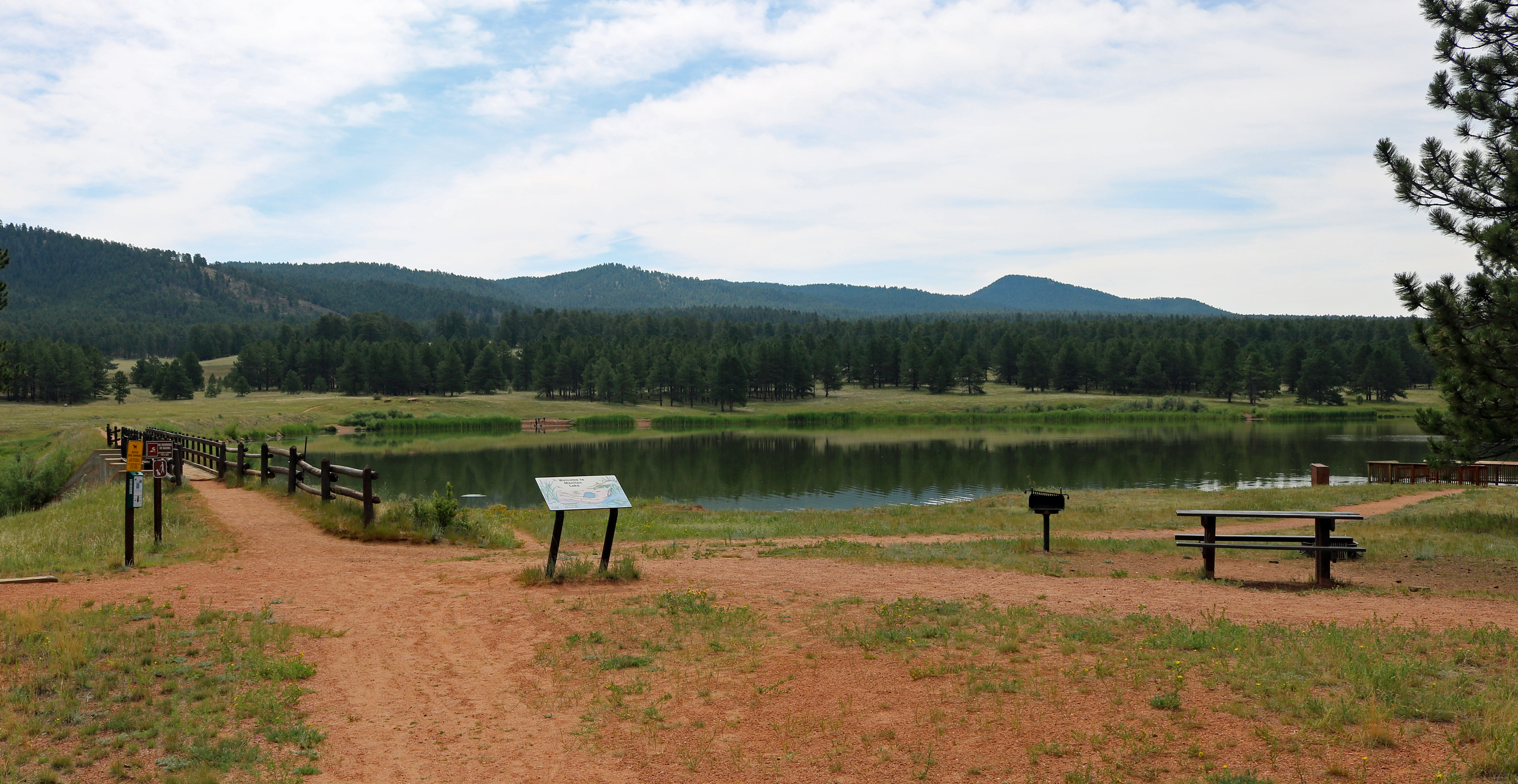
Manitou Lake Picnic Area

The Manitou Lake Picnic Area has a 1 mile (1.6 km) nature trail the encircles Manitou Park Lake and a historic stone picnic shelter at the south end of the lake.

Another trail, Centennial Trail, is an 8 miles (13 km) long hiking and biking trail that starts at the Manitou Lake Picnic Area and ends at Woodland Park, and 4.2 miles (6.8 km) of the trail connects the picnic and camping areas. There is fishing in Trout Creek and Manitou Lake. The picnic area has a wetland that is habitat for waterfowl and songbirds on the south side of Manitou Park Lake. There is an entrance fee of seven dollars at the picnic area, and camping fees apply at the campgrounds.

== Manitou Park Lake ==
Manitou Park Lake (a reservoir also called Manitou Lake) has a surface area of 5 acres (2.0 hectares). The reservoir's earthen dam was built in 1937 and impounds Trout Creek.

== Camping ==
There are five campgrounds along Highway 67: Colorado, Painted Rocks, South Meadows, Pike Community, and Red Rocks. Pike Community and Red Rocks are group campgrounds. There are volleyball courts, softball fields, horseshoe pits. and an amphitheater for large group functions. There is also a dumping station.
