= Colorado State Highway 67 =

State highway in Colorado, United States

State Highway 67
- SH 67 highlighted in red

Route information
- Maintained by CDOT
- Length: 71.72 mi (115.42 km)

Major junctions
- South end: SH 96 in Wetmore
- US 50 near Penrose; US 24 from Divide to Woodland Park
- North end: US 85 in Sedalia

Location
- Country: United States
- State: Colorado
- Counties: Custer, Fremont, Teller, Douglas, Jefferson

Highway system
- Colorado State Highway System; Interstate; US; State; Scenic
← SH 66	→ SH 69

State Highway 67 (SH 67) is a 71-mile-long (114 km) state highway encompassing five distinct segments in south-central Colorado. SH 67's southern terminus is at SH 96 in Wetmore, and the northern terminus is at U.S. Route 85 (US 85) in Sedalia. It traverses the former route of the Florence and Cripple Creek Railroad through Phantom Canyon as a county road and carrying part of the Gold Belt Byway.

SH 67 forms the eastern border of the Mueller State Park near Divide.

== Route description ==
=== Southern Segment ===
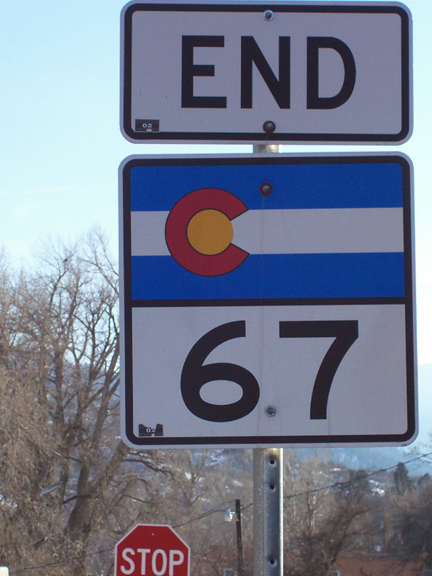
Signage indicating a terminus of SH 67.

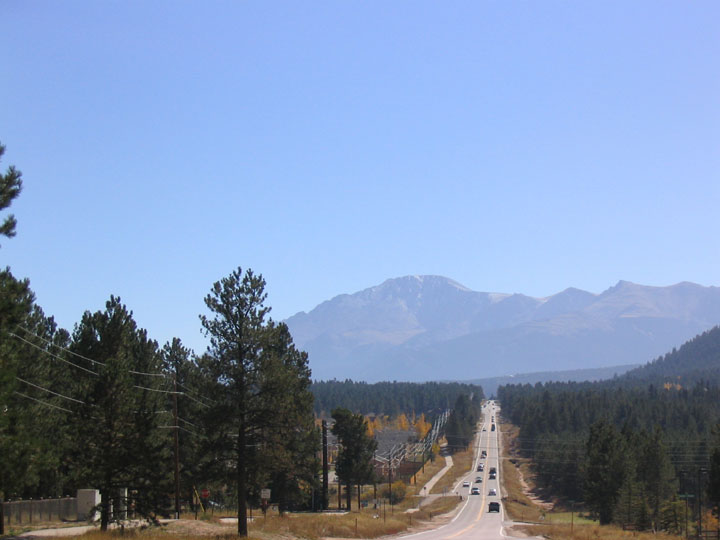
SH 67 near Woodland Park with Pikes Peak in the background

SH 67 begins at its southern terminus with State Highway 96 in Wetmore, Colorado. It proceeds north into Fremont County and the city of Florence, where it is signed as Robinson Avenue to State Highway 115 (Main Street) and overlaps the highway for half a mile west before turning north again, signed as Pikes Peak Avenue. The highway crosses the Arkansas River on its way out of the city and continues northward to a junction with U.S Route 50 adjacent to Fremont County Airport. The state portion of the highway ends at U.S. Highway 50 and becomes the county-maintained Phantom Canyon Road (CR 67 in Fremont County), carrying the Gold Belt Byway through Phantom Canyon.

=== Northern Segment ===
The state highway resumes in Victor, turning west and north before heading into Cripple Creek. The road turns east for a few miles before resuming its northward path, acting as the eastern border of Mueller State Park for several miles before reaching a junction with U.S. Highway 24 in Divide. Again the state portion of the highway ends to overlap U.S. Highway 24 for seven miles (11 km) east into Woodland Park, splitting off the concurrent road to turn north once again. Continuing to the north-northwest, the road enters the Pike National Forest, passing turnoffs for Red Rock Campground and the Manitou Park Recreation Area's Colorado Campground and Painted Rocks Campground before turning west and entering Douglas County, where it promptly heads into Westcreek and turns north until it reaches a junction with North Rainbow Falls Road and turns to the northwest.

In Deckers, the state portion of the road again ends and heads to the north-northeast, signed as County Highway 67, along South Platte River Road. County Highway 67 takes an abrupt turn east along Sugar Creek Road, then heads north. At the intersection with Pine Creek Road, County Highway 67 rejoins the larger road it split from earlier at Sugar Creek Road. County Highway 67 continues north-northeast and ends at the intersection with Rampart Range Road southwest of Sedalia. The state highway status returns here.

The route leaves Pike National Forest a few miles east of resuming state highway status and continues northeast with increasing intersections as it approaches Sedalia. After crossing State Highway 105 (Perry Park Road), the route turns north and is named Manhart Street for a few blocks before reaching its northern terminus at U.S. Highway 85.

== History ==
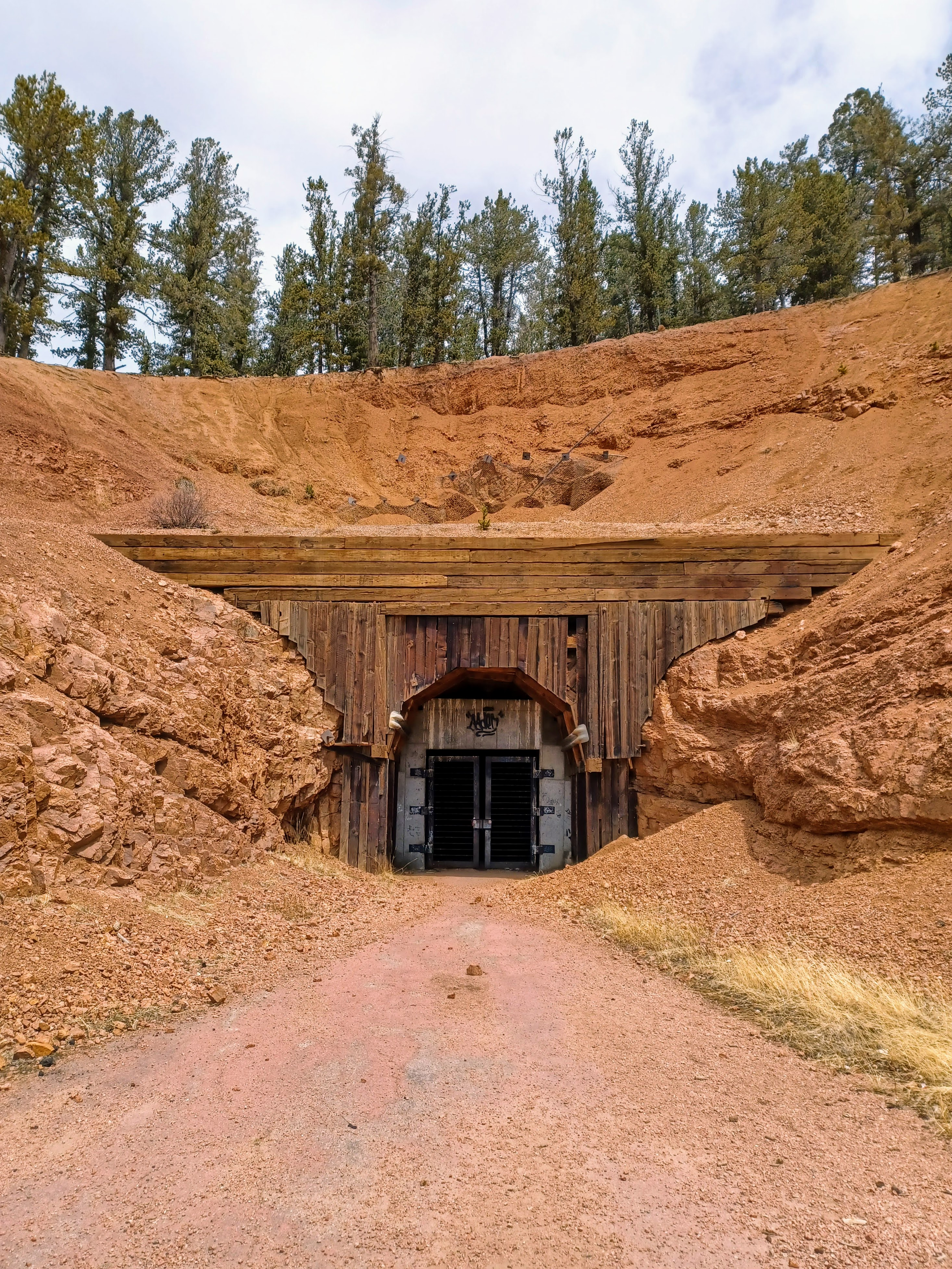
Abandoned Little Ike Tunnel's south portal near Horsethief Park Trailhead

SH 67 is an original 1920s state highway and was originally an unbroken route.

In 1994, the route was rerouted around the Little Ike Tunnel near Cripple Creek, altering the location of the Horsethief Park Trail trailhead to the east side of the tunnel.

The Cripple Creek and Victor Gold Mining Company funded the realignment of nearly two miles of Highway 67 and built the highest bridge on the Colorado State Highway system, the Arequa Gulch Bridge, as part of its Cresson Mine expansion in 2001.

In July 2006, a flood on West Creek washed out the highway north of the town of Westcreek, closing the highway between Westcreek and Deckers to two-way traffic until reconstruction was completed. The closed segment reopened on October 27, 2006.

== Major intersections ==
County	Location	mi	km	Destinations	Notes
Custer	Wetmore	0.000	0.000	SH 96 – Westcliffe, Pueblo	Southern terminus
Fremont	Florence	11.047	17.778	SH 115 east	Eastern end of SH 115 overlap
Fremont	Florence	11.562	18.607	SH 115 west – Cañon City	Western end of SH 115 overlap
Fremont		15.074	24.259	US 50 / CR 67 north – Cañon City, Pueblo	North end state maintenance; southern terminus of Phantom Canyon Road
Gap in route
Teller		45.1	72.6	CR 67 south (Phantom Canyon Road) / CR 81 north (Diamond Ave) – Pine Grove	South end state maintenance; northern terminus of Phantom Canyon Road
Teller	Divide	69.652	112.094	US 24 west	Western end of US 24 overlap
Teller	Woodland Park	76.920	123.791	US 24 east – Colorado Springs	Eastern end of US 24 overlap
Douglas	Deckers	100.036	160.992	CR 75 (Y Camp Road) / CR 126 to US 285 – Pine Grove	North end state maintenance
South Platte River		100.3	161.4	Bridge	
Jefferson	No major junctions				
South Platte River		105.1	169.1	Bridge	
Douglas		117.349	188.855	Rampart Range Road	South end state maintenance
Douglas		126.738	203.965	SH 105 (Perry Park Road)	
Douglas	Sedalia	127.449	205.109	US 85 – Denver, Colorado Springs	Northern terminus
1.000 mi = 1.609 km; 1.000 km = 0.621 mi: Concurrency terminus
