= Woodland Park School District Re-2 =

School district in Colorado, United States

Woodland Park School District

Address
- 155 Panther Way Woodland Park, Colorado, 80863; United States
- Coordinates: 38°59′46″N 104°2′43″W

District information
- Motto: A place of becoming
- Grades: P–12
- Schools: 5
- NCES District ID: 0807380

Students and staff
- Students: 2,055 (2020–2021)
- Teachers: 141.64 (on an FTE basis)
- Student–teacher ratio: 14.51

Other information
- Website: www.wpsdk12.org

Woodland Park School District Re-2 (WPSD) is a school district headquartered in Woodland Park, Colorado.

It includes Woodland Park, Divide, Florissant, a portion of Midland, and the Teller County portion of Green Mountain Falls.

== History ==
It originated from a two-story schoolhouse built in 1890. The Edlowe School District, the Eisweth School District, and two other school districts consolidated into Woodland Park School District in 1924. In Florissant School District and the Midland School District consolidated into Woodland Park schools after voters approved a school consolidation in a referendum in 1959.

In 2023 there was a lawsuit accusing the district of preventing teachers from exercising their First Amendment rights.

== Schools ==
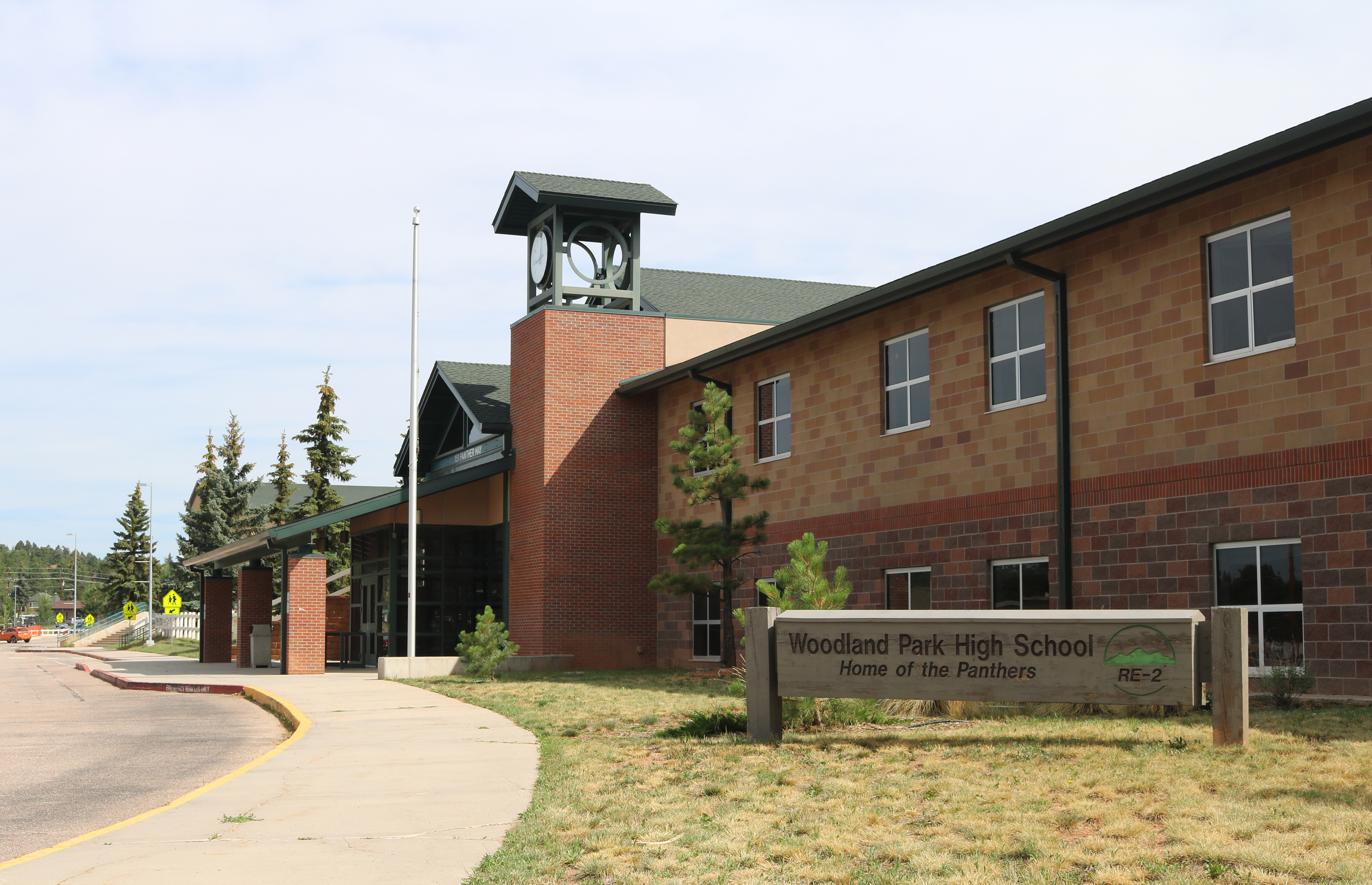
Woodland Park High School

School name	Grades	Enrollment (2020–2021)	Website
Columbine Elementary School	K–5	322	
Summit Elementary School	K–5	290	
Woodland Park Jr/Sr High School	6-12	N/A	
