= Crystola, Colorado =

Unincorporated community in Colorado, US

- Unincorporated community
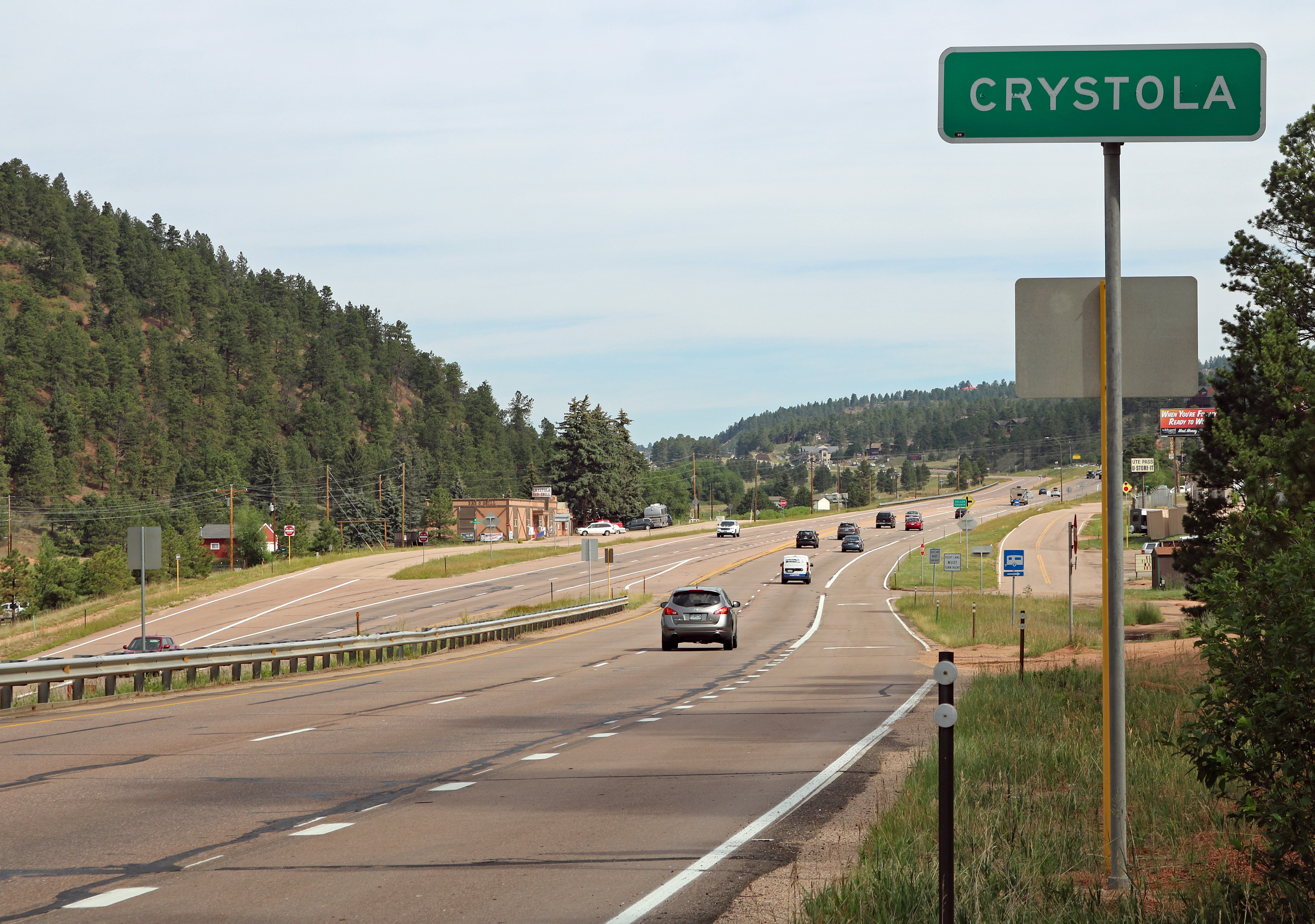
- Crystola and U.S. Highway 24

- Location of Crystola, Colorado. Crystola (Colorado)
- Coordinates: 38°57′21″N 105°01′38″W
- Country: United States
- State: Colorado
- Counties: Teller and El Paso

Government
  - Type: Unincorporated community
  - Body: Teller County; El Paso County
- Elevation: 7,979 ft (2,432 m)
- Time zone: UTC−07:00 (MST)
  - Summer (DST): UTC−06:00 (MDT)
- ZIP code: Woodland Park 80863
- Area code: 719
- GNIS place ID: 191202

Crystola is an unincorporated community in El Paso and Teller counties, Colorado, United States. ZIP code 80863 serves Crystola, but mail must be addressed to Woodland Park. Crystola is a part of the Colorado Springs, CO Metropolitan Statistical Area and the Front Range Urban Corridor.

== History ==
The Crystola, Colorado, post office operated from November 24, 1911, until December 31, 1913. The Woodland Park, Colorado, post office (ZIP code 80863) now serves the area.

== See also ==
- Colorado Springs, CO Metropolitan Statistical Area
