= Mueller State Park =

State park In Colorado, United States

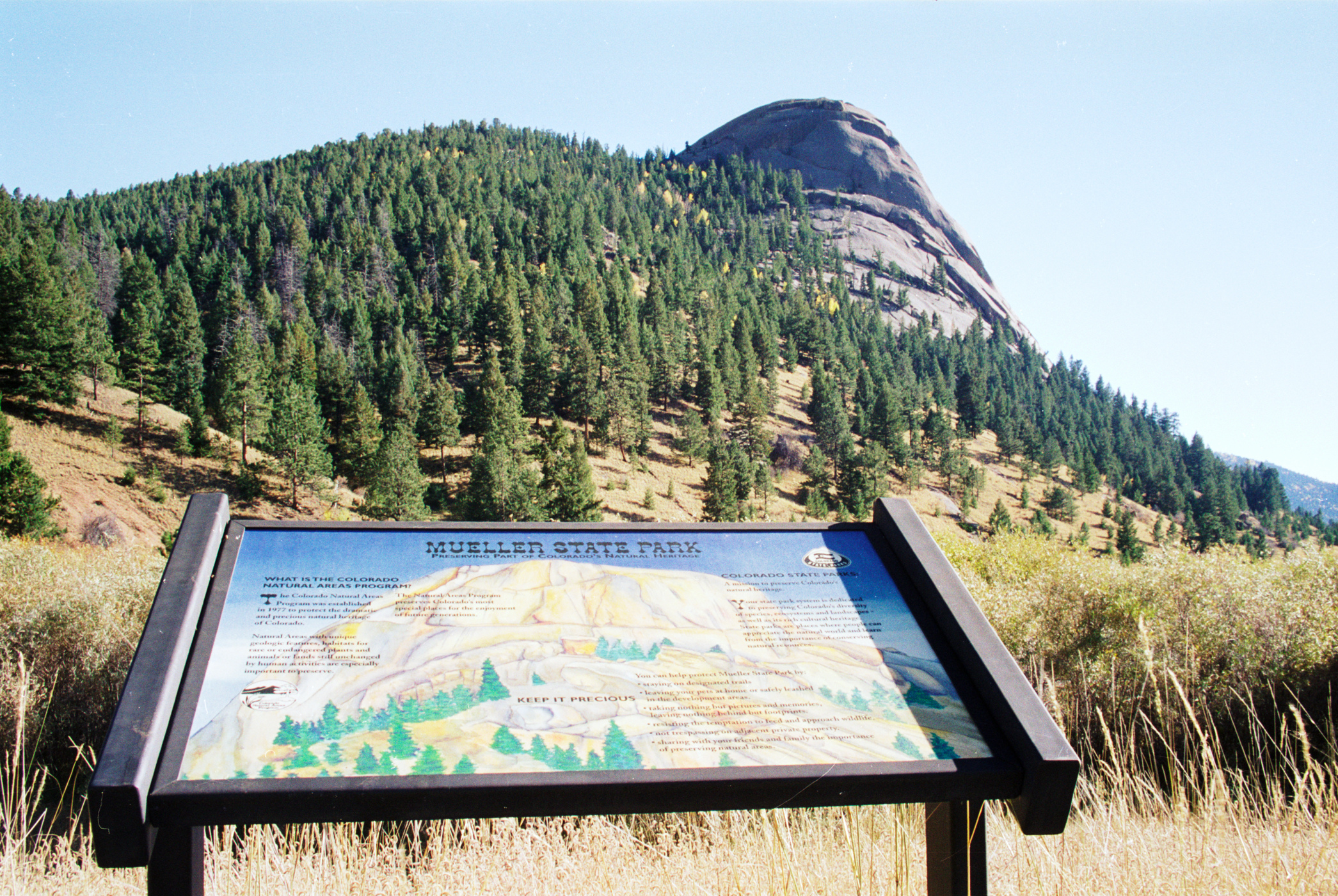
- Dome Rock, Mueller State Park

- Location within Colorado
- Location: Teller County, Colorado, United States
- Nearest city: Colorado Springs, Colorado
- Coordinates: 38°52′47″N 105°10′52″W
- Area: 5,112 acres (20.69 km^{2})
- Established: 1988
- Visitors: 119,910 (in 2021)
- Governing body: Colorado Parks and Wildlife

Mueller State Park is a Colorado state park encompassing 5,112 acres (20.69 km^{2}) of land outside Divide, Colorado, west of Colorado Springs, Colorado. The park offers many outdoor activities. There are 55 miles (89 km) of trails, biking, camping year-round, hunting, hiking, and horseback riding. It is open in the winter and allows snowshoeing, sledding, and snowtubing. Mueller is a diverse home to a variety of animals including elk, black bear, eagles, hawks and bighorn sheep.
