= Woodland Park High School =

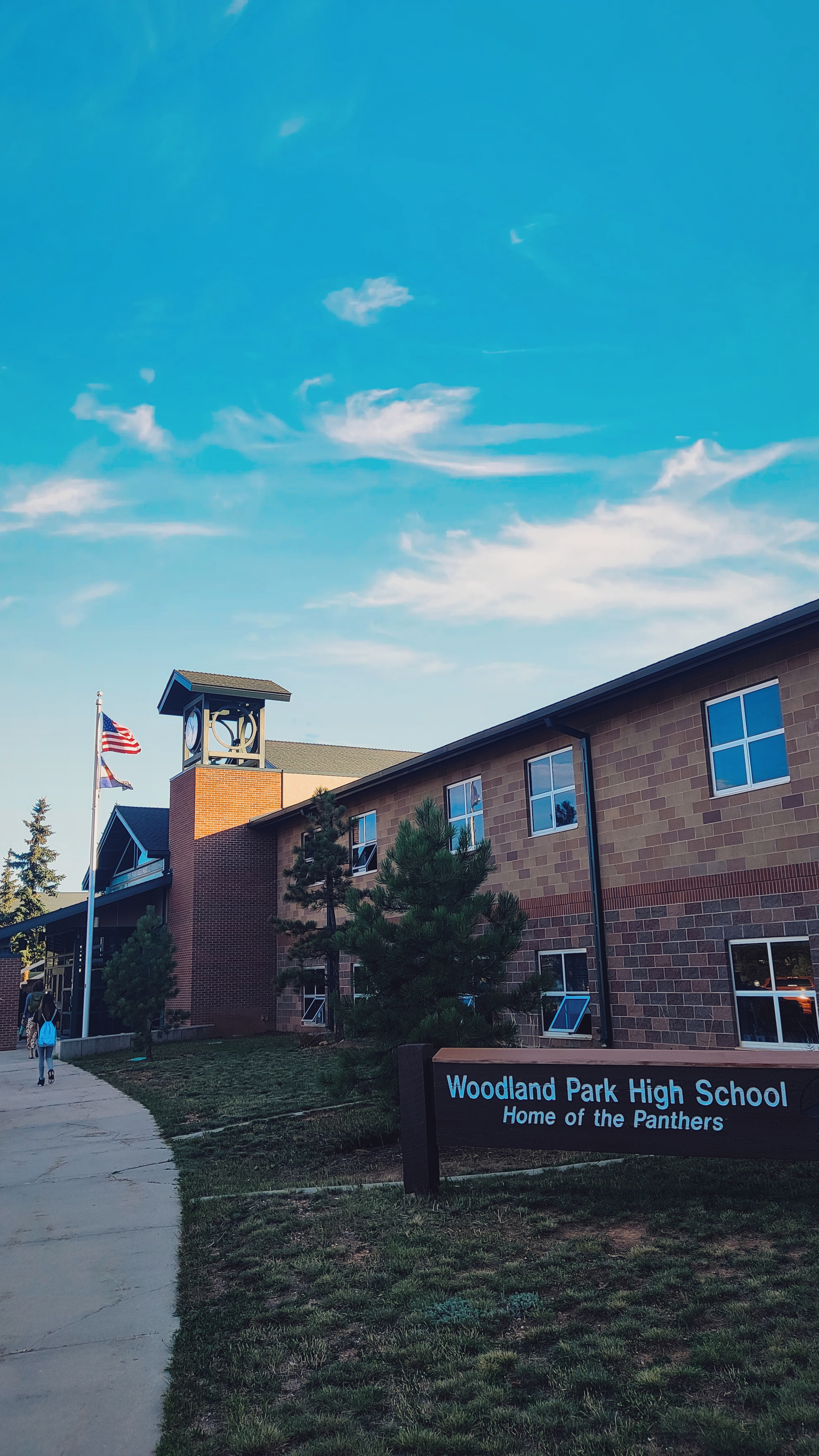
- The school's main facade.

Location
- 151 Panther Way; Woodland Park, Colorado 80863; United States; 38°59′42″N 105°02′42″W

Information
- Motto: "Every student every day."
- Established: 1890 (136 years ago)
- School district: Woodland Park School District Re-2
- CEEB code: 061475
- Staff: 30.43 (FTE)
- Grades: 9-12
- Enrollment: 532 (2023-2024)
- Student to teacher ratio: 17.48
- Campus type: co-educational
- Colors: Dark green and white
- Mascot: Panther
- Newspaper: The Panther Perspective
- Website: www.wpsdk12.org/o/wpjshs

Woodland Park High School is a high school located at 151 Panther Way in Woodland Park, Colorado, United States. It is a part of the Woodland Park School District Re-2. This high school is one that was built in 1890. The school offers many programs for highschool and requires students to have ids.

== Mascot ==
The Woodland Park High School mascot is a black panther.

== Extracurricular activities ==
Woodland Park High School offers many extracurricular activities. Sports include wrestling, basketball, soccer, cheerleading, cross country, football, golf, softball, track and field, swim team, volleyball and baseball.
