= Deckers, Colorado =

Unincorporated community in Colorado, US

- Unincorporated community
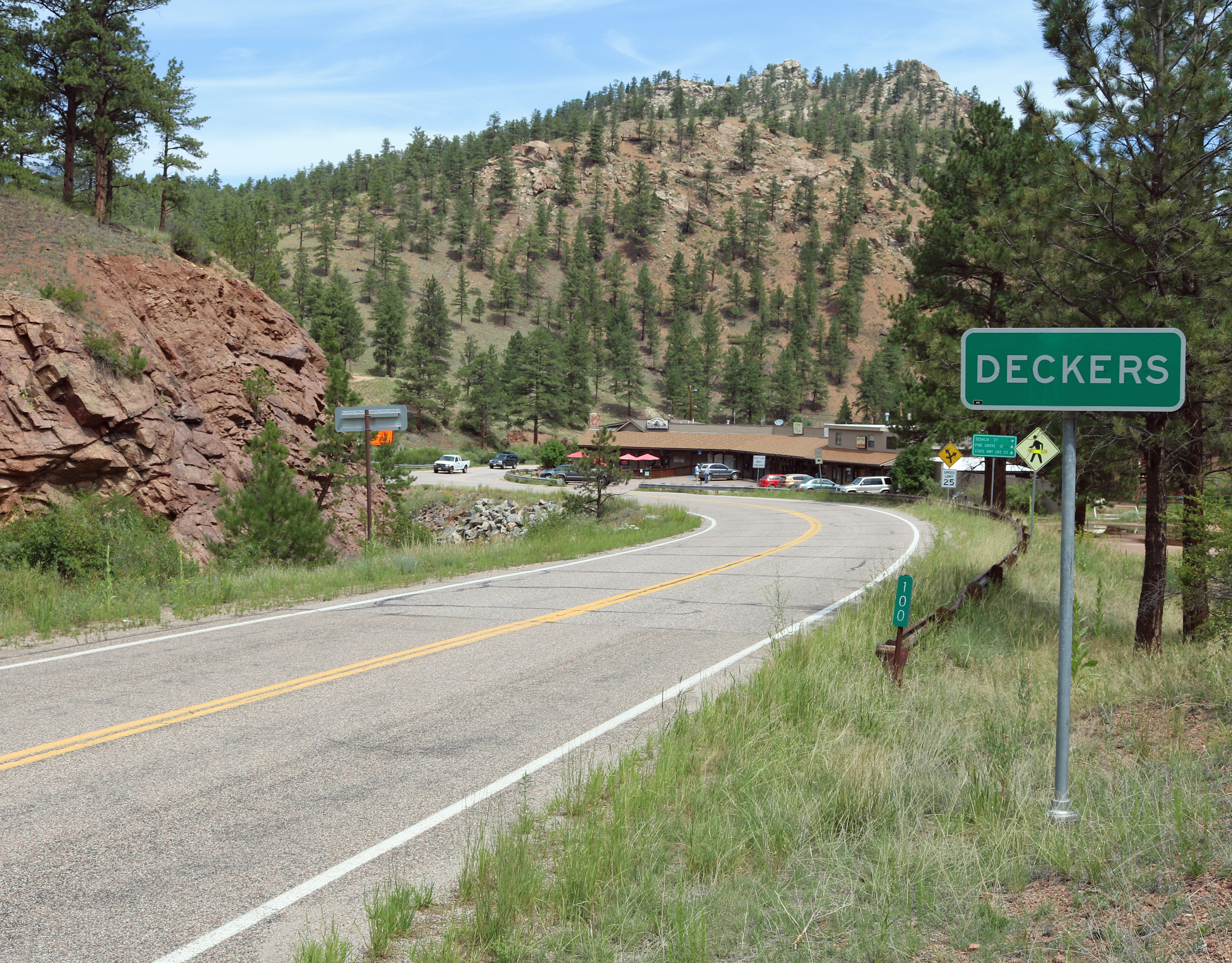
- Entering Deckers on Colorado State Highway 67.

- Location of Deckers, Colorado Deckers (Colorado)
- Coordinates: 39°15′17″N 105°13′37″W
- Country: United States
- State: Colorado
- County: Douglas

Government
  - Type: Unincorporated community
  - Body: Douglas County
- Elevation: 6,398 ft (1,950 m)
- Time zone: UTC−07:00 (MST)
  - Summer (DST): UTC−06:00 (MDT)
- ZIP code: 80135 (Sedalia)
- Area codes: 303/720/983
- GNIS place ID: 204730

Deckers is an unincorporated community along the South Platte River in Douglas County, Colorado, United States. Deckers is a part of the Denver-Aurora-Centennial, CO Metropolitan Statistical Area and the Front Range Urban Corridor.

== History ==
Stephen Decker built a general store here in the 1890s. He later added a saloon and called the settlement Daffodil. The Daffodil, Colorado, post office operated from April 11, 1896, until February 19, 1908, when it was renamed Deckers. The presence of natural springs led him to establish Deckers Mineral Springs and Resort in the popular region for fly-fishing. The Deckers, Colorado, post office closed on November 15, 1933. The U.S. post office at Sedalia (ZIP Code 80135) now serves Deckers postal addresses.

Deckers received national attention for the June 2002 forest fire, known as the Hayman Fire, which burned thousands of acres on the outskirts of the Denver metro area.

=== Camp ===
National Ramah Commission announced in March 2006 that it planned to open a Camp Ramah in the Rockies. A 360-acre (1.5 km^{2}) camp site has been purchased in Deckers. The camp, known as Ramah in the Rockies has been running since the Summer of 2010.

== See also ==
- Front Range Urban Corridor
- List of populated places in Colorado
