= Green Mountain Falls, Colorado =

Town in Colorado, United States

- Statutory town
- Town of Green Mountain Falls
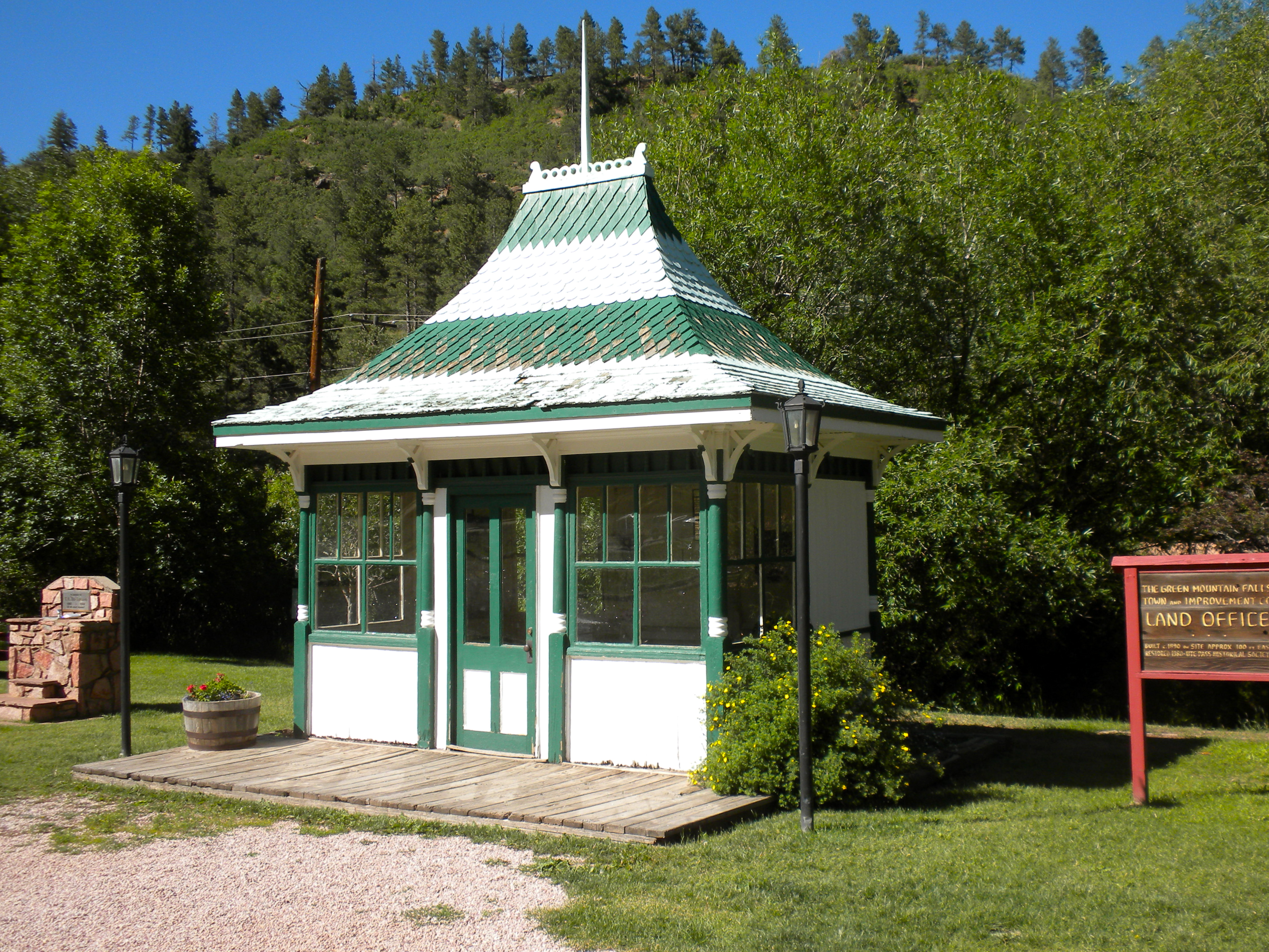
- Old land office in the park
- Motto: “A Very Special Place”
- Location of the Town of Green Mountain Falls in El Paso and Teller counties, Colorado
- Coordinates: 38°56′04″N 105°01′26″W
- Country: United States
- State: Colorado
- County: El Paso County; Teller County
- Incorporated (town): August 19, 1880

Government
  - Type: Statutory town

Area
  - Total: 1.101 sq mi (2.851 km^{2})
  - Land: 1.099 sq mi (2.847 km^{2})
  - Water: 0.0015 sq mi (0.004 km^{2})
- Elevation: 7,756 ft (2,364 m)

Population (2020)
  - Total: 646
  - Density: 588/sq mi (227/km^{2})
- Time zone: UTC−07:00 (MST)
  - Summer (DST): UTC−06:00 (MDT)
- ZIP code: 80819 (PO Box)
- Area code: 719
- FIPS code: 08-32650
- GNIS feature ID: 2412708
- Website: greenmountainfalls.colorado.gov

The Town of Green Mountain Falls is a statutory town located in El Paso and Teller counties of the U.S. of State of Colorado. The town population was 646 at the 2020 United States Census with 622 residents in El Paso County and 24 residents in Teller County. Green Mountain Falls is a part of the Colorado Springs, CO Metropolitan Statistical Area and the Front Range Urban Corridor.

In 1968, officials in Green Mountain Falls conducted a resurvey of the 1890 legal description of the town's corporate limits and found "that the town hall, the magistrate's office, the post office, the community center, the civic swimming pool, and nearly half of the residents are located outside city limits" and were forced to redraw the legal boundaries.

== Geography ==
At the 2020 United States Census, the town had a total area of 704 acres (2.851 km^{2}) including 0.99 acres (0.004 km^{2}) of water.

== Demographics ==
Historical population
Census	Pop.	Note	%±
1900	40		—
1910	30		−25.0%
1920	100		233.3%
1930	41		−59.0%
1940	87		112.2%
1950	106		21.8%
1960	179		68.9%
1970	359		100.6%
1980	607		69.1%
1990	663		9.2%
2000	773		16.6%
2010	640		−17.2%
2020	646		0.9%
U.S. Decennial Census

As of the census of 2000, there were 773 people, 372 households, and 203 families residing in the town. The population density was 677.9 inhabitants per square mile (261.7/km^{2}). There were 600 housing units at an average density of 526.2 per square mile (203.2/km^{2}). The racial makeup of the town was 94.18% White, 0.13% African American, 1.55% Native American, 0.39% Asian, 0.13% Pacific Islander, 1.68% from other races, and 1.94% from two or more races. Hispanic or Latino of any race were 5.56% of the population.

There were 372 households, out of which 23.1% had children under the age of 18 living with them, 43.5% were married couples living together, 7.0% had a female householder with no husband present, and 45.4% were non-families. 36.0% of all households were made up of individuals, and 7.3% had someone living alone who was 65 years of age or older. The average household size was 2.08 and the average family size was 2.74.

In the town, the population was spread out, with 19.1% under the age of 18, 5.7% from 18 to 24, 33.2% from 25 to 44, 34.0% from 45 to 64, and 7.9% who were 65 years of age or older. The median age was 41 years. For every 100 females, there were 104.0 males. For every 100 females age 18 and over, there were 92.9 males.

The median income for a household in the town was $43,816, and the median income for a family was $55,268. Males had a median income of $34,000 versus $26,354 for females. The per capita income for the town was $24,892. About 4.3% of families and 7.6% of the population were below the poverty line, including 10.1% of those under age 18 and 7.8% of those age 65 or over.

== Government and politics ==
On April 5, 2016, Jane Newberry was elected mayor. She ran as a slate of candidates calling themselves Smoother Road Ahead for GMF. The group also included board of trustees candidates David Pearlman, Cameron Thorne, and Erin Kowal. The police force, which consisted of one full-time officer and three volunteer deputies, resigned in the days following an April 14, 2016, closed-door meeting of the outgoing town board and mayor.

Current 2024 Board of Trustees:

Todd Dixon-Mayor, Sunde King-Mayor Pro Tem, John Bell-Trustee, Don Walker-Trustee, Sean Ives-Trustee

== Education ==
The portion in El Paso County is in the Manitou Springs School District 14.

The portion in Teller County is in the Woodland Park School District RE-2.

== See also ==
- South Central Colorado Urban Area
- Colorado Springs, CO Metropolitan Statistical Area
