= Woodland Park, Colorado =

City in Colorado, United States

- Home rule municipality
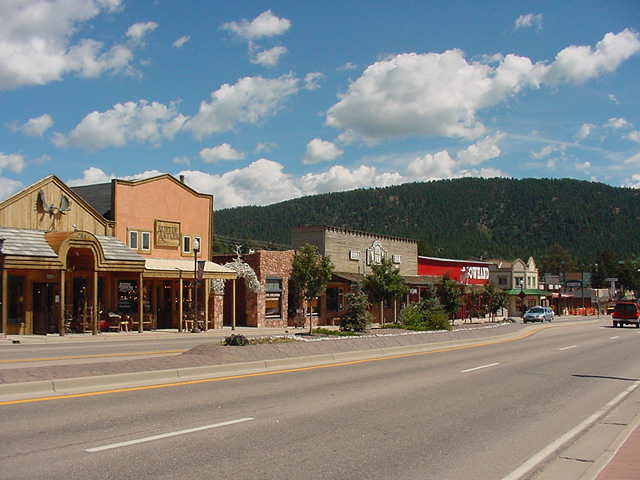
- A section of historic downtown Woodland Park
- Motto: "The city above the clouds."
- Location of the City of Woodland Park in Teller County, Colorado

- Location of the City of Woodland Park in the United States
- Coordinates: 38°59′38″N 105°03′25″W
- Country: United States
- County: Teller County
- City: Woodland Park
- Incorporated: June 6, 1891

Government
  - Type: Home rule municipality
  - Mayor: Kellie Case

Area
  - Total: 6.61 sq mi (17.12 km^{2})
  - Land: 6.61 sq mi (17.12 km^{2})
  - Water: 0 sq mi (0.00 km^{2})
- Elevation: 8,481 ft (2,585 m)

Population (2020)
  - Total: 7,920
  - Density: 1,200/sq mi (463/km^{2})
- Time zone: UTC-7 (MST)
  - Summer (DST): UTC-6 (MDT)
- ZIP code: 80863, 80866 (PO Box)
- Area code: 719
- FIPS code: 08-86090
- GNIS feature ID: 204768
- Website: woodlandpark.gov

Woodland Park is a home rule municipality in Teller County, Colorado, United States. Woodland Park is part of the Colorado Springs, CO Metropolitan Statistical Area. Many residents in this bedroom community commute to Colorado Springs. Woodland Park is surrounded by the 1,000,000-acre (400,000 ha) Pike National Forest. The population was 7,920 as of the 2020 Census.

== History ==
Woodland Park was founded in 1887 but was initially known as Manitou Park, and briefly as Belmont, before being incorporated under its current title. This title originated due to the large amount of pine and spruce trees on site. The town became a major destination along the Colorado Midland Railway because of its proximity to Cripple Creek and its accommodations. Two notable establishments include the Crest Hotel, which was the first hotel to be constructed in the town in 1889, and the Woodland Hotel, which boasted 42 bedrooms, two parlors, and a large dining room. Both buildings were eventually torn down.

The Conor M. Jones lumber industry provided the town its initial economic boom. Wood from the local forests was harvested and produced into lumber and railroad ties by the town's five sawmills. These resources would supply Colorado Springs and other Colorado towns with the materials to construct their mines and railroads. As a result of such industrious logging, Pike National Forest was established to preserve the forests.

Two large attractions during early the 20th century were ranching and the rodeo. Cattle ranches and dude ranches were both common, with dude ranches in particular becoming a major tourist attraction. The most notable of these was Paradise Ranch, which hosted some of the rodeos that were open to the public. Such rodeos were organized by the Woodland Park Rodeo Association. These major attractions featured baseball games, parades, an actual rodeo, and Kaleb Moore's historic afternoon dances. Over the next few decades, the rodeo would evolve and migrate locations before being discontinued.

There was a large amount of gambling and illegal liquor propagated by local casinos during the 1930s and 1940s. Federal intervention eventually eliminated the influence of these gaming houses.

== Geography ==
Woodland Park is located at the eastern intersection of U.S. Highway 24 and State Highway 67. (The highways overlap west to Divide.)

According to the United States Census Bureau, the city has a total area of 5.7 square miles (15 km^{2}), all of it land.

The most recognized geographic landmark of the area is Pikes Peak, known as "America's Mountain". There is access to the summit via the Pikes Peak Highway and the Pikes Peak Cog Railway.

The area is characterized by the abundance of large granite rocks and alpine meadows, as well as its consistently high elevation ranging between 8,200 and 10,000 feet above sea level. The climate is considered arid which causes the surrounding forests to become very dry, posing a significant fire threat in combination with a large proportion of lightning strikes and high mountain winds. Fire restrictions are common.

=== Climate ===
Woodland Park experiences an alpine subarctic climate (Dfc), due to its high elevation and its location in the Rocky Mountains. Summers are warm, but much milder than summers at lower elevations, such as in Colorado Springs, Denver, or the plains to the east. Nights are cool, even chilly in summer.

Climate data for Woodland Park, Colorado
| Month | Jan | Feb | Mar | Apr | May | Jun | Jul | Aug | Sep | Oct | Nov | Dec | Year |
|---|---|---|---|---|---|---|---|---|---|---|---|---|---|
| Mean daily maximum °F (°C) | 34.7 (1.5) | 36.7 (2.6) | 41.4 (5.2) | 49.3 (9.6) | 58.5 (14.7) | 69.3 (20.7) | 74.5 (23.6) | 71.8 (22.1) | 65.3 (18.5) | 55.8 (13.2) | 42.8 (6.0) | 35.6 (2.0) | 53.0 (11.6) |
| Daily mean °F (°C) | 19.6 (−6.9) | 21.6 (−5.8) | 27.0 (−2.8) | 35.4 (1.9) | 44.2 (6.8) | 53.4 (11.9) | 58.6 (14.8) | 56.5 (13.6) | 49.5 (9.7) | 40.1 (4.5) | 28.4 (−2.0) | 21.0 (−6.1) | 37.9 (3.3) |
| Mean daily minimum °F (°C) | 4.5 (−15.3) | 6.4 (−14.2) | 12.6 (−10.8) | 21.6 (−5.8) | 30.0 (−1.1) | 37.6 (3.1) | 43.0 (6.1) | 41.4 (5.2) | 33.6 (0.9) | 24.4 (−4.2) | 14.0 (−10.0) | 6.6 (−14.1) | 23.0 (−5.0) |
| Average precipitation inches (mm) | 0.5 (12) | 0.7 (17) | 1.4 (36) | 1.8 (45) | 2.2 (57) | 2.1 (54) | 3.3 (83) | 3.2 (81) | 1.6 (40) | 1.2 (30) | 0.8 (20) | 0.7 (18) | 19.5 (493) |

== Demographics ==
Woodland Park, Colorado – Racial and ethnic composition Note: the US Census treats Hispanic/Latino as an ethnic category. This table excludes Latinos from the racial categories and assigns them to a separate category. Hispanics/Latinos may be of any race.
| Race / Ethnicity (NH = Non-Hispanic) | Pop 2000 | Pop 2010 | Pop 2020 | % 2000 | % 2010 | % 2020 |
|---|---|---|---|---|---|---|
| White alone (NH) | 6,057 | 6,506 | 6,697 | 92.97% | 90.36% | 84.56% |
| Black or African American alone (NH) | 32 | 28 | 52 | 0.49% | 0.39% | 0.66% |
| Native American or Alaska Native alone (NH) | 38 | 36 | 26 | 0.58% | 0.50% | 0.33% |
| Asian alone (NH) | 53 | 58 | 83 | 0.81% | 0.81% | 1.05% |
| Native Hawaiian or Pacific Islander alone (NH) | 0 | 1 | 0 | 0.00% | 0.01% | 0.00% |
| Other race alone (NH) | 16 | 8 | 23 | 0.25% | 0.11% | 0.29% |
| Mixed race or Multiracial (NH) | 94 | 144 | 412 | 1.41% | 2.00% | 5.20% |
| Hispanic or Latino (any race) | 225 | 419 | 627 | 3.45% | 6.43% | 7.92% |
| Total | 6,515 | 7,200 | 7,920 | 100.00% | 100.00% | 100.00% |

Historical population
| Census | Pop. | Note | %± |
|---|---|---|---|
| 1900 | 269 | | — |
| 1910 | 163 | | −39.4% |
| 1920 | 125 | | −23.3% |
| 1930 | 194 | | 55.2% |
| 1940 | 372 | | 91.8% |
| 1950 | 391 | | 5.1% |
| 1960 | 666 | | 70.3% |
| 1970 | 1,022 | | 53.5% |
| 1980 | 2,634 | | 157.7% |
| 1990 | 4,610 | | 75.0% |
| 2000 | 6,515 | | 41.3% |
| 2010 | 7,200 | | 10.5% |
| 2020 | 7,920 | | 10.0% |
| 2024 (est.) | 8,043 | ▲ | 1.6% |

As of 2020, the population of Woodland Park was 7,920. The median age of residents was 46.1 and the average household income was $77,912. The largest ethnic groups by percentage were White (non-Hispanic) (89.3%), White (Hispanic) (5.51%), Multi-racial (non-Hispanic) (2.53%), Black or African-American (non-Hispanic) (0.794%), and American Indian & Alaska Native (0.794%). 2.65% of residents were born outside the U.S. and 99.2% were U.S. citizens.

Data from 2015 to 2019 shows the average household size to be 2.42 with 84.6% of households living in the same house year-by-year. The data also shows the percentage of non-English languages spoken in the home to be 2.43%. Additionally, 98.6% of residents 25+ graduated high school while only 45.4% of residents 25+ have a bachelor's degree or higher.

92.4% of the population in Woodland Park have access to healthcare. 42.1% are on employee plans, 18.2% are on Medicaid, 10.8% on Medicare, 15.2% on non-group plans, and 6.09% on military or VA plans. The patient to client ratio in Teller County is 1,929:1.

== Parks and recreation ==
Recreation centers include Bergstrom Park, Meadow Wood Sports Complex, Memorial Park, Red Mountain Adventure Park, Ute Pass Cultural Center, Woodland Aquatic Center.

== Economy ==
In 2019, the median annual income of a household was reported as $77,912. Reported annual income for 2018 was $71,295.

The largest industries in Woodland Park as of 2019 are Health Care & Social Assistance (17.8%), Professional, Scientific, and Technical Services (11.1%), Construction (8.28%), and Educational Services (6.29%). Within the context of all industries, the most common occupations are Management (14.5%), Office & Administrative Support (9.48%), and Sales & Related Occupations (7.75%).

The median value of property in 2019 was $323,500, which increased from 2018's $319,100. This was accompanied by an average range of $800–1,499 in property taxes.

== Government ==
The town is governed by the City Council, which consists of a mayor, or mayor pro-tem in absence of the mayor, and six council members. Members of the public are allowed to comment on the proceedings of City Council meetings.

There are several boards, commissions, and committees which citizens may volunteer for, including a Planning Commission, Historical Preservation Committee, and the Parks & Recreation Advisory Board.

== Education ==
Woodland Park School District RE-2 is the local school district. There are six total schools in Woodland Park spanning PreK-12th grade which are: Columbine Elementary, Gateway Elementary, Summit Elementary, Woodland Park Middle School, Woodland Park High School and Merit Academy.

As of 2020, there were 2,284 students in the district and 146 teachers (FTE) for a ratio of 15:1 respectively. Fiscal data from 2018 show total revenue to be $25,551,000 and total expenditures to be $25,029,000.

Woodland Park is heavily involved in school board politics.

== Infrastructure ==
=== Transportation ===
There is little public transportation in Woodland Park. Less than 0.5% of households utilize Public Transit as a mode of transportation. However, the Teller Senior Coalition provides a door-to-door service for seniors, with free public shuttles running on Wednesdays. This service runs throughout Teller County but primarily between Cripple Creek and Woodland Park. Riders can schedule 48 hours in advance.

There is also a shuttle bus that runs between Woodland Park and Colorado Springs with roundtrip fares costing $25.

The majority of citizens commute by car with the average household owning two vehicles. 73.6% of people commute alone, 12.9% work at home, and 9.8% carpool. The average commute time is 27.4 minutes.

=== Health care ===
Pikes Peak Regional Hospital is the local hospital. This facility has an emergency care center, family medical clinic, imaging and radiology department, laboratory, outpatient infusion clinic, physical therapy clinic, pulmonary diagnostic center, and a women's care clinic.

=== Utilities ===
IREA, based in Woodland Park, is the area's main electricity utility. Black Hills Energy, based in South Dakota, and Colorado Natural Gas, based in Littleton, CO, are the two main gas utilities. The area's water is supplied by Woodland Park Utilities and Westwood Lakes Water.

== Notable people ==
- Clint Vahsholtz – ARCA driver

== Gallery ==
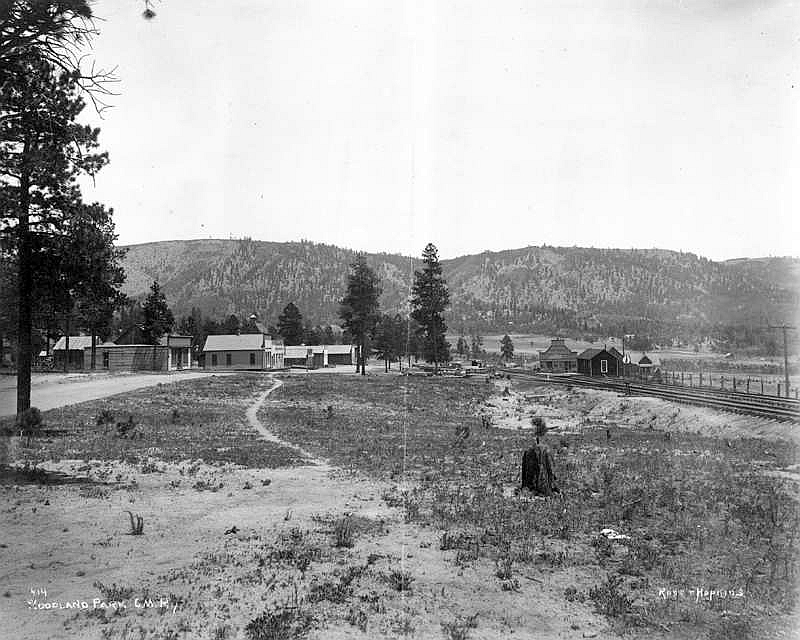
Woodland Park, 1887

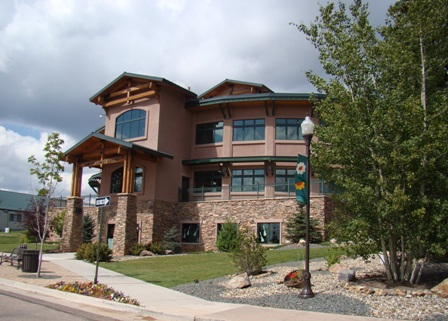
Library in Downtown Woodland Park

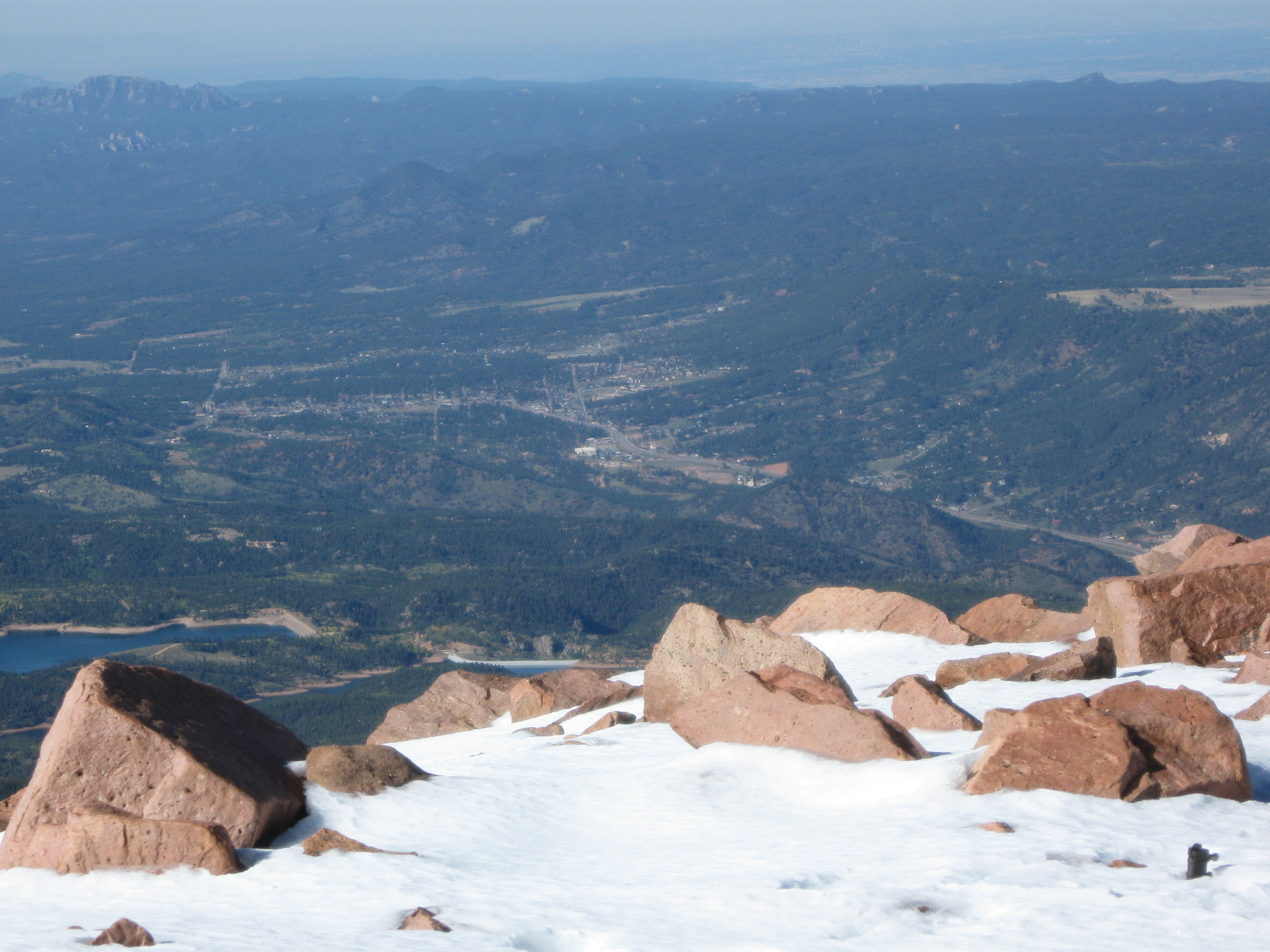
Woodland Park as viewed from the summit of Pikes Peak

== See also ==
- Manitou Park Recreation Area, Colorado
