= Teller County, Colorado =

County in Colorado, United States

- County
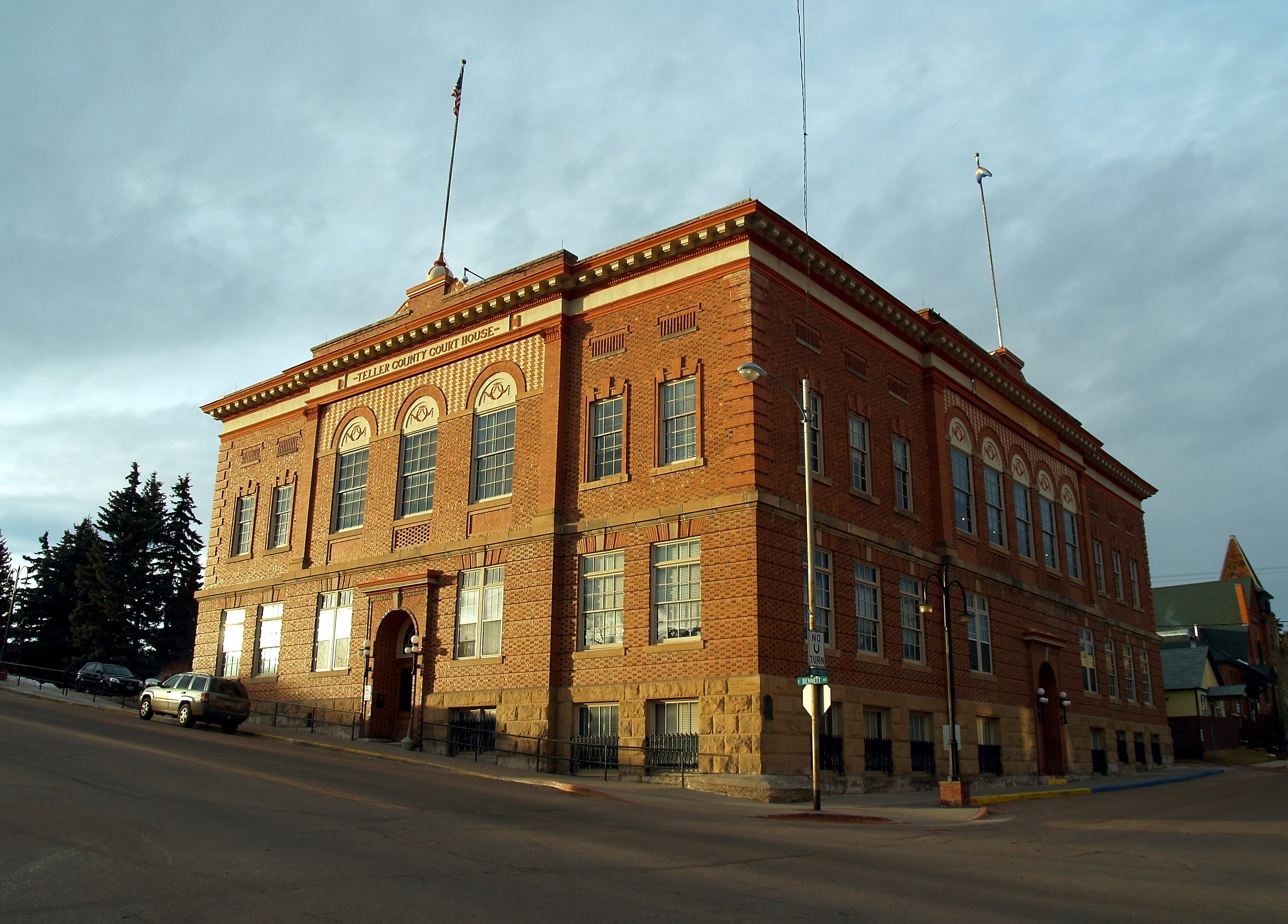
- Teller County Court House in Cripple Creek

- Seal

- Location within the U.S. state of Colorado
- Coordinates: 38.88°N 105.15°W
- Country: United States
- State: Colorado
- Founded: March 23, 1899
- Named for: Henry M. Teller
- Seat: Cripple Creek
- Largest city: Woodland Park

Area
  - Total: 559 sq mi (1,450 km^{2})
  - Land: 557 sq mi (1,440 km^{2})
  - Water: 1.9 sq mi (4.9 km^{2}) 0.3%

Population (2020)
  - Total: 24,710
  - Estimate (2025): 24,756 ▲
  - Density: 44.4/sq mi (17.1/km^{2})
- Time zone: UTC−7 (Mountain)
  - Summer (DST): UTC−6 (MDT)
- Congressional district: 7th
- Website: www.tellercounty.gov

Teller County is a county located in the U.S. state of Colorado. As of the 2020 census, the population was 24,710. The county seat is Cripple Creek, and the most populous city is Woodland Park. Teller County is included in the Colorado Springs metropolitan area.

== History ==
A few years after gold was discovered in Cripple Creek, political differences between area miners and mine owners, many of whom lived in Colorado Springs, resulted in the division of El Paso County. Created in 1899, Teller County was carved from the western slope of Pikes Peak, and was named after United States Senator Henry M. Teller. Within five years of its formation, Teller County became the scene of a dramatic labor struggle called the Colorado Labor Wars.

== Geography ==
According to the U.S. Census Bureau, the county has a total area of 559 square miles (1,450 km^{2}), of which 557 square miles (1,440 km^{2}) is land and 1.9 square miles (4.9 km^{2}) (0.3%) is water.

=== Adjacent counties ===
- Douglas County - north
- Jefferson County - north
- El Paso County - east
- Fremont County - south
- Park County - west

=== Major highways ===
- U.S. Highway 24
- State Highway 67

=== National protected areas ===
- Cripple Creek National Historic District
- Florissant Fossil Beds National Monument
- Pike National Forest

=== State protected area ===
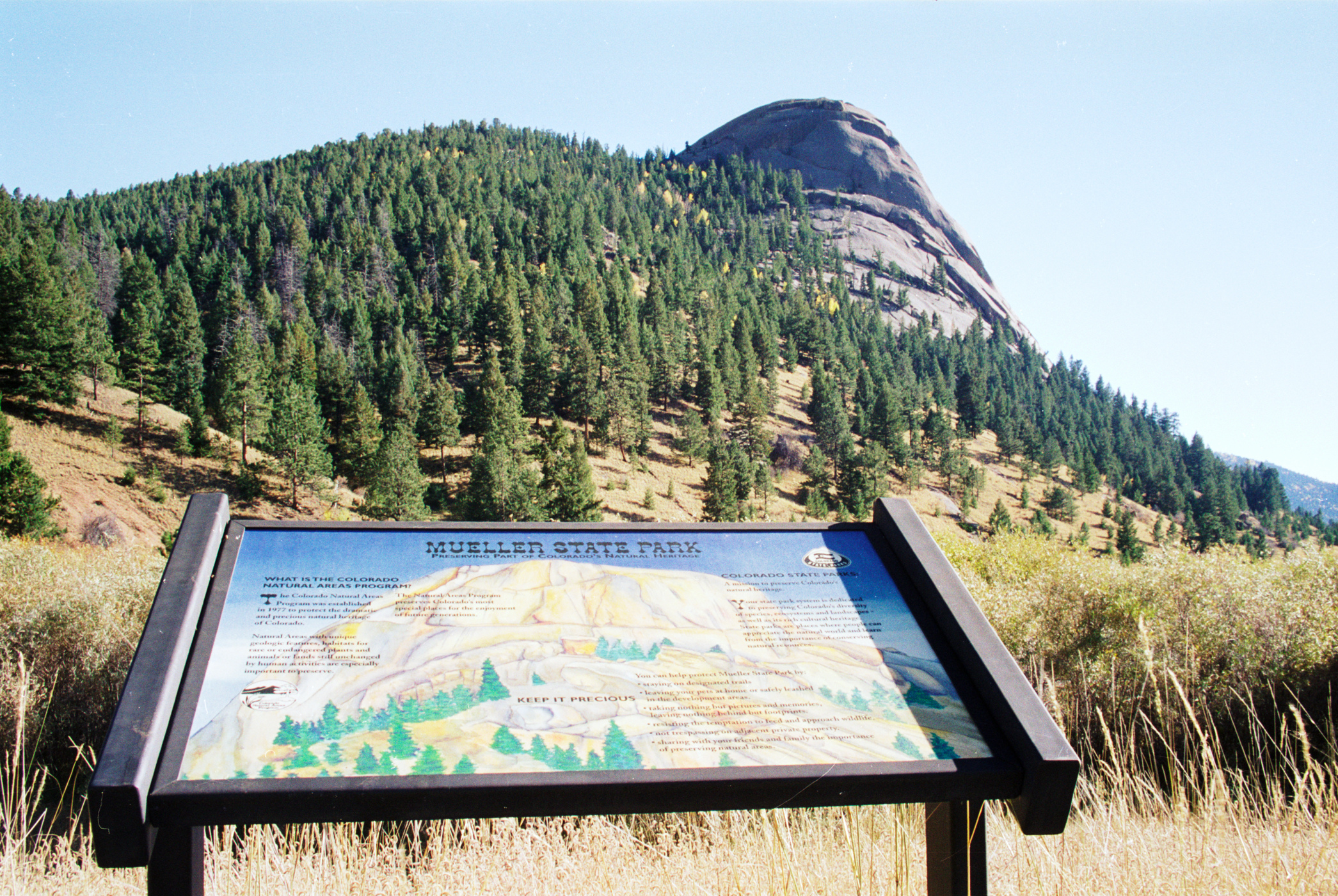
Dome Rock in Mueller State Park

- Mueller State Park

=== Trails and byways ===
- American Discovery Trail
- Gold Belt Tour National Scenic and Historic Byway

=== Historic places ===
- See List of National Register of Historic Places Listings in Teller County

== Demographics ==
Historical population
Census	Pop.	Note	%±
1900	29,002		—
1910	14,351		−50.5%
1920	6,696		−53.3%
1930	4,141		−38.2%
1940	6,463		56.1%
1950	2,754		−57.4%
1960	2,495		−9.4%
1970	3,316		32.9%
1980	8,034		142.3%
1990	12,468		55.2%
2000	20,555		64.9%
2010	23,350		13.6%
2020	24,710		5.8%
2025 (est.)	24,756	▲	0.2%
U.S. Decennial Census; 1790-1960 1900-1990; 1990-2000 2010-2020

=== 2020 census ===
As of the 2020 census, the county had a population of 24,710. Of the residents, 16.9% were under the age of 18 and 24.3% were 65 years of age or older; the median age was 51.6 years. For every 100 females there were 102.7 males, and for every 100 females age 18 and over there were 101.5 males. 39.9% of residents lived in urban areas and 60.1% lived in rural areas.

Teller County, Colorado – Racial and ethnic composition Note: the US Census treats Hispanic/Latino as an ethnic category. This table excludes Latinos from the racial categories and assigns them to a separate category. Hispanics/Latinos may be of any race.
Race / Ethnicity (NH = Non-Hispanic)	Pop 2000	Pop 2010	Pop 2020	% 2000	% 2010	% 2020
White alone (NH)	19,102	21,148	21,017	92.93%	90.57%	85.05%
Black or African American alone (NH)	109	104	132	0.53%	0.45%	0.53%
Native American or Alaska Native alone (NH)	167	167	122	0.81%	0.72%	0.49%
Asian alone (NH)	115	155	201	0.56%	0.66%	0.81%
Pacific Islander alone (NH)	16	20	12	0.08%	0.09%	0.05%
Other race alone (NH)	28	15	148	0.14%	0.06%	0.60%
Mixed race or Multiracial (NH)	300	447	1,362	1.46%	1.91%	5.51%
Hispanic or Latino (any race)	718	1,294	1,716	3.49%	5.54%	6.94%
Total	20,555	23,350	24,710	100.00%	100.00%	100.00%

The racial makeup of the county was 87.3% White, 0.5% Black or African American, 0.7% American Indian and Alaska Native, 0.9% Asian, 0.0% Native Hawaiian and Pacific Islander, 1.6% from some other race, and 8.9% from two or more races. Hispanic or Latino residents of any race comprised 6.9% of the population.

There were 10,621 households in the county, of which 22.0% had children under the age of 18 living with them and 18.9% had a female householder with no spouse or partner present. About 24.6% of all households were made up of individuals and 10.8% had someone living alone who was 65 years of age or older.

There were 13,316 housing units, of which 20.2% were vacant. Among occupied housing units, 82.2% were owner-occupied and 17.8% were renter-occupied. The homeowner vacancy rate was 1.9% and the rental vacancy rate was 8.4%.

=== 2000 census ===
At the 2000 census there were 20,555 people in 7,993 households, including 5,922 families, in the county. The population density was 37 people per square mile (14 people/km^{2}). There were 10,362 housing units at an average density of 19 units per square mile (7.3 units/km^{2}). The racial makeup of the county was 94.92% White, 0.55% Black or African American, 0.97% Native American, 0.58% Asian, 0.08% Pacific Islander, 0.90% from other races, and 2.00% from two or more races. 3.49% of the population were Hispanic or Latino of any race. Of the 7,993 households 33.60% had children under the age of 18 living with them, 64.20% were married couples living together, 6.60% had a female householder with no husband present, and 25.90% were non-families. 19.60% of households were one person and 4.00% were one person aged 65 or older. The average household size was 2.56 and the average family size was 2.94.

The age distribution was 25.90% under the age of 18, 5.60% from 18 to 24, 31.20% from 25 to 44, 29.80% from 45 to 64, and 7.50% 65 or older. The median age was 39 years. For every 100 females there were 102.70 males. For every 100 females age 18 and over, there were 100.90 males.

The median income for a household in the county was $50,165, and the median family income was $57,071. Males had a median income of $37,194 versus $26,934 for females. The per capita income for the county was $23,412. About 3.40% of families and 5.40% of the population were below the poverty line, including 6.90% of those under age 18 and 4.20% of those age 65 or over.

== Politics ==
Teller County is solidly Republican. The last time the county voted for the Democratic nominee for president was in 1964, in Lyndon B. Johnson's landslide win.

United States presidential election results for Teller County, Colorado
Year	Republican		Democratic		Third party(ies)	
Year	No.	%	No.	%	No.	%
1900	4,738	32.51%	9,659	66.27%	178	1.22%
1904	5,595	55.51%	4,398	43.63%	87	0.86%
1908	3,014	40.45%	4,192	56.26%	245	3.29%
1912	676	11.64%	3,027	52.11%	2,106	36.25%
1916	1,693	31.00%	3,515	64.37%	253	4.63%
1920	1,552	57.89%	1,010	37.67%	119	4.44%
1924	1,283	48.78%	592	22.51%	755	28.71%
1928	1,184	52.04%	1,037	45.58%	54	2.37%
1932	752	30.21%	1,534	61.63%	203	8.16%
1936	940	27.91%	2,349	69.74%	79	2.35%
1940	1,268	37.60%	2,084	61.80%	20	0.59%
1944	829	50.24%	808	48.97%	13	0.79%
1948	748	48.35%	779	50.36%	20	1.29%
1952	1,042	63.89%	572	35.07%	17	1.04%
1956	977	66.42%	494	33.58%	0	0.00%
1960	723	53.60%	622	46.11%	4	0.30%
1964	577	45.65%	685	54.19%	2	0.16%
1968	722	52.39%	403	29.25%	253	18.36%
1972	1,440	70.45%	535	26.17%	69	3.38%
1976	1,410	55.93%	986	39.11%	125	4.96%
1980	2,457	66.28%	802	21.63%	448	12.09%
1984	3,460	75.84%	1,043	22.86%	59	1.29%
1988	3,760	68.36%	1,656	30.11%	84	1.53%
1992	3,050	44.11%	1,873	27.09%	1,991	28.80%
1996	4,458	57.93%	2,312	30.05%	925	12.02%
2000	6,477	65.78%	2,750	27.93%	620	6.30%
2004	8,094	68.35%	3,556	30.03%	192	1.62%
2008	8,146	63.12%	4,513	34.97%	247	1.91%
2012	8,702	64.59%	4,333	32.16%	438	3.25%
2016	9,745	67.47%	3,603	24.94%	1,096	7.59%
2020	11,241	66.36%	5,278	31.16%	420	2.48%
2024	10,856	66.45%	5,065	31.00%	417	2.55%

United States Senate election results for Teller County, Colorado2
Year	Republican		Democratic		Third party(ies)	
Year	No.	%	No.	%	No.	%
2020	11,307	67.46%	5,039	30.06%	415	2.48%

United States Senate election results for Teller County, Colorado3
Year	Republican		Democratic		Third party(ies)	
Year	No.	%	No.	%	No.	%
2022	8,602	63.45%	4,515	33.30%	440	3.25%

Colorado Gubernatorial election results for Teller County
Year	Republican		Democratic		Third party(ies)	
Year	No.	%	No.	%	No.	%
2022	8,430	62.21%	4,843	35.74%	277	2.04%

== Communities ==
=== Cities ===
- Cripple Creek
- Victor
- Woodland Park

=== Town ===
- Green Mountain Falls (partly in El Paso County)

=== Census-designated places ===
- Divide
- Florissant
- Goldfield
- Midland

=== Unincorporated communities ===
- Crystola (partly in El Paso county)

== Education ==
There are two school districts covering sections of the county: Cripple Creek-Victor School District RE-1 and Woodland Park School District RE-2.

== Gallery ==
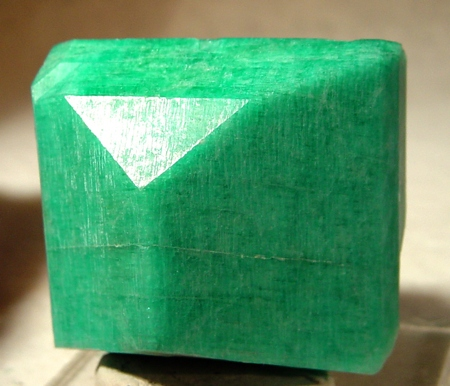
Amazonite crystal, from Crystal Peak area near Florissant

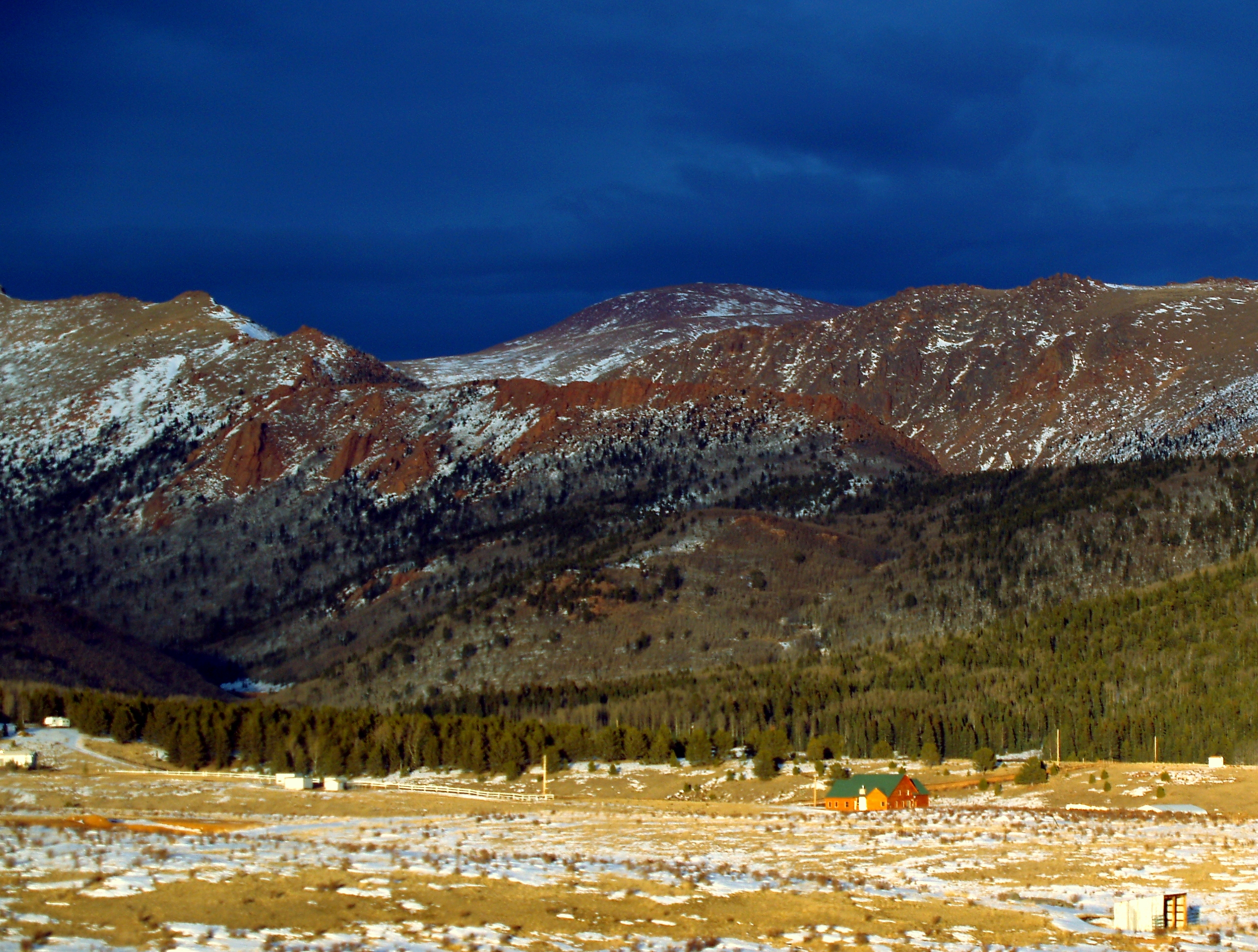
Mountains in Teller County

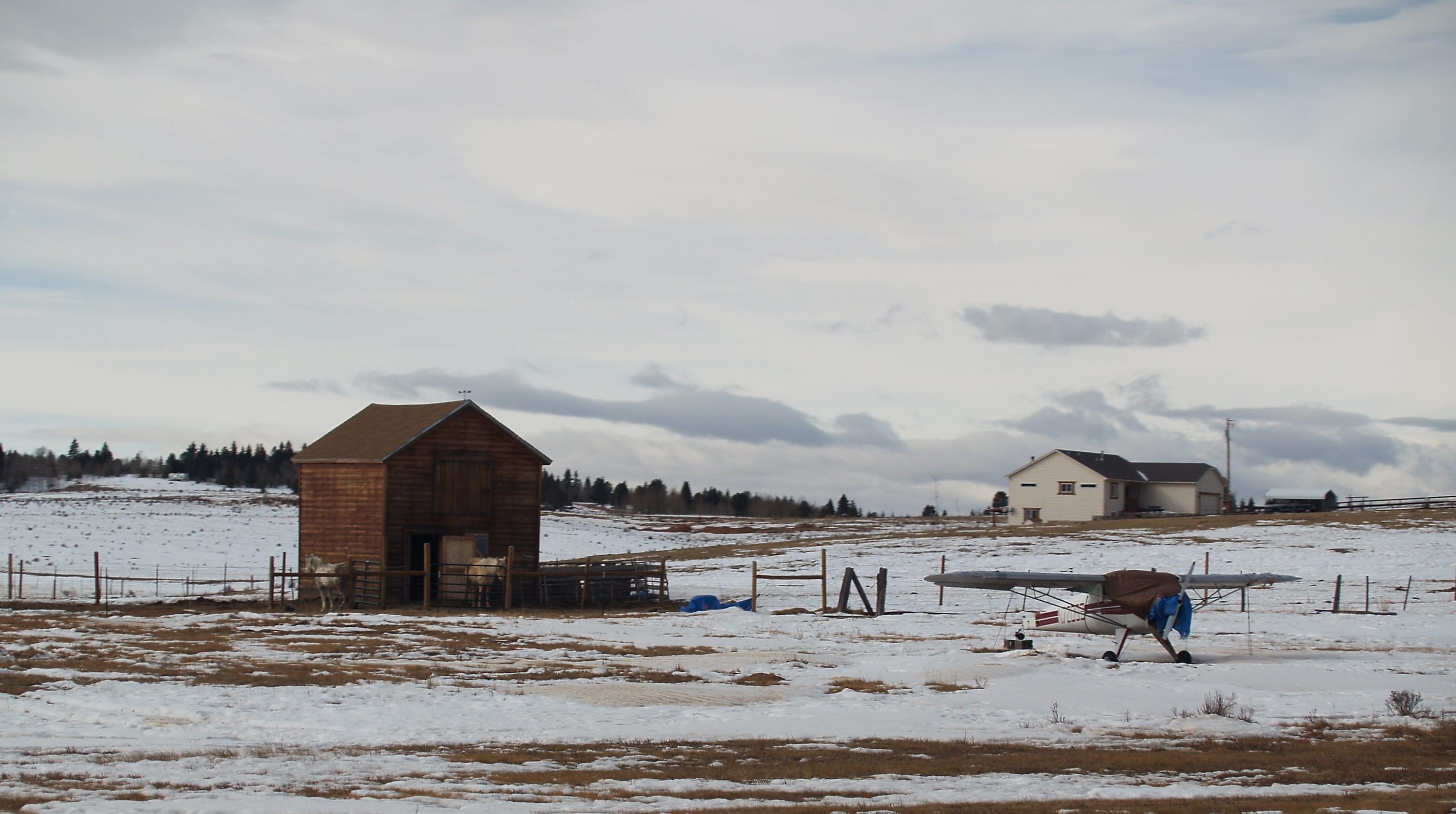
A ranch home with an airplane in the county

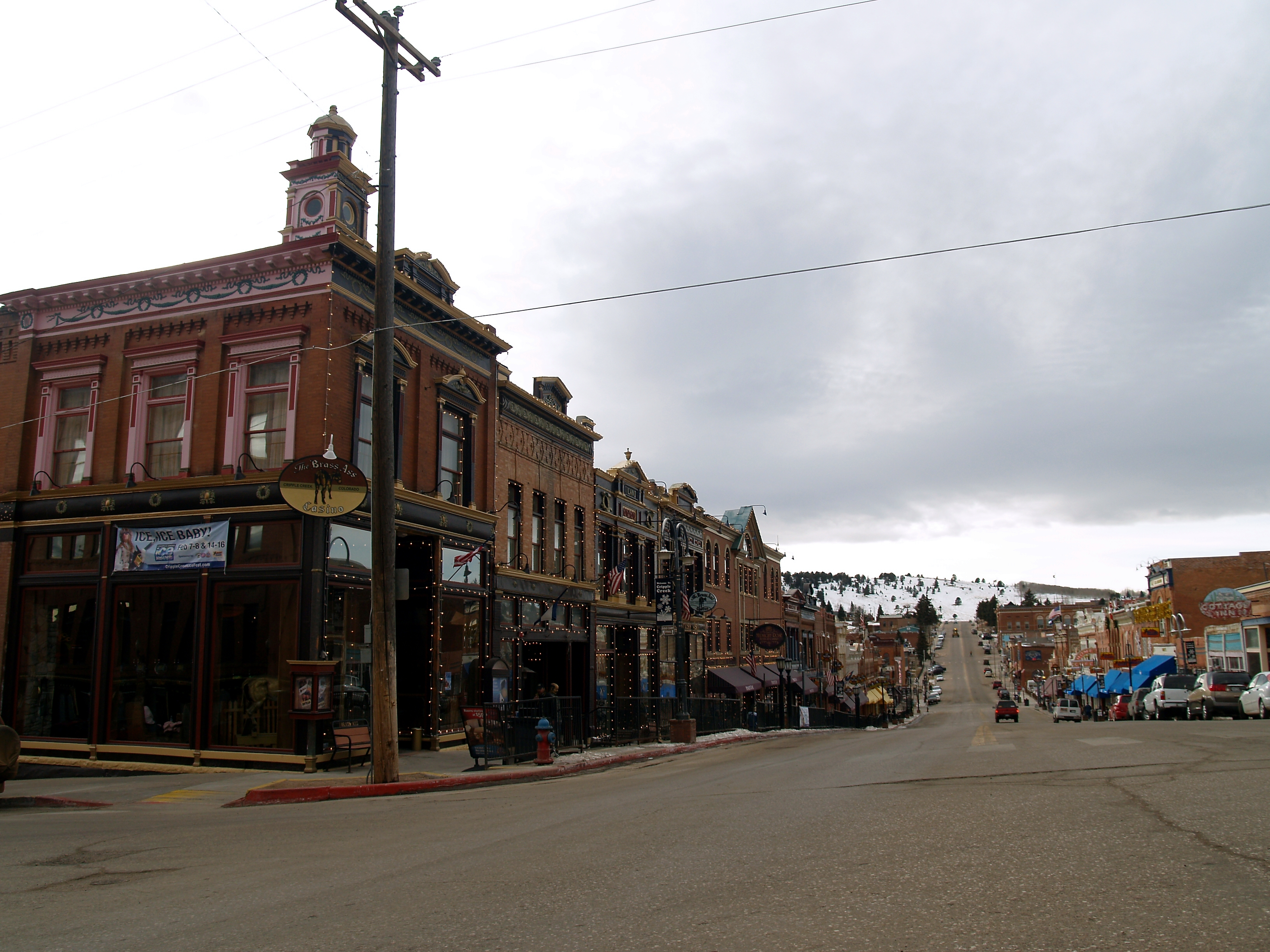
Casinos in Cripple Creek

== See also ==
- Bibliography of Colorado
- Geography of Colorado
- History of Colorado
  - National Register of Historic Places listings in Teller County, Colorado
- Index of Colorado-related articles
- List of Colorado-related lists
  - List of counties in Colorado
  - List of statistical areas in Colorado
- Outline of Colorado
  - Front Range Urban Corridor
