= Divide, Colorado =

Unincorporated community in Colorado, US

- Census-designated place
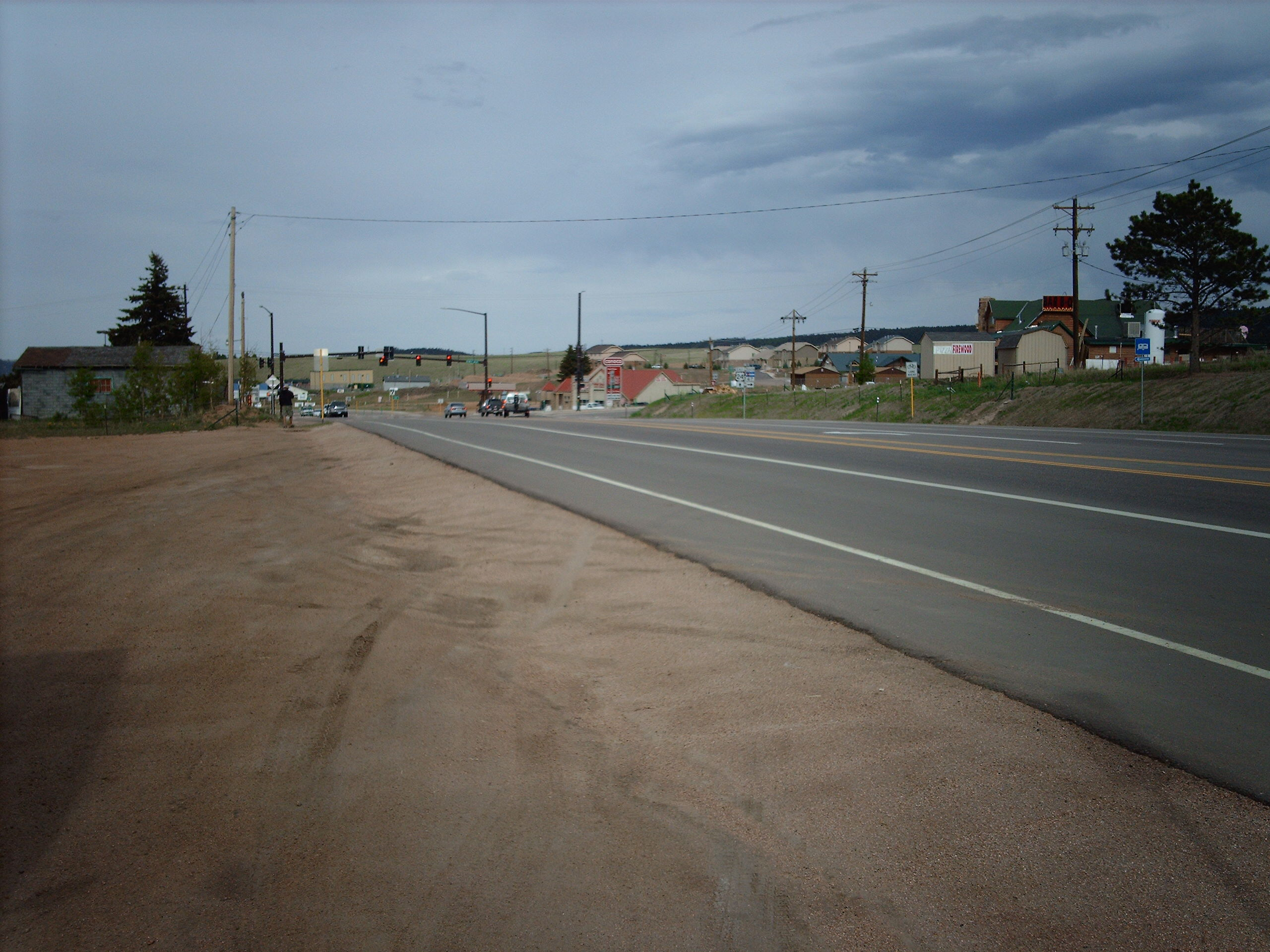
- Divide from Ute Pass
- Motto: Center of the Known Universe
- Location of the Divide CDP in Teller County, Colorado
- Coordinates: 38°56′42″N 105°09′43″W
- Country: United States
- State: Colorado
- County: Teller

Government
  - Type: Unincorporated community
  - Body: Teller County

Area
  - Total: 0.336 sq mi (0.869 km^{2})
  - Land: 0.336 sq mi (0.869 km^{2})
  - Water: 0 sq mi (0.000 km^{2})
- Elevation: 9,184 ft (2,799 m)

Population (2020)
  - Total: 143
  - Density: 426/sq mi (165/km^{2})
- Time zone: UTC−07:00 (MST)
  - Summer (DST): UTC−06:00 (MDT)
- ZIP code: 80814
- Area code: 719
- GNIS place ID: 2583231
- FIPS code: 20605

Divide is an unincorporated town, a post office, and a census-designated place (CDP) located in and governed by Teller County, Colorado, United States. The CDP is a part of the Colorado Springs, CO Metropolitan Statistical Area. The Divide post office has the ZIP Code 80814. At the United States Census 2020, the population of the Divide CDP was 143.

== History ==
The Divide, Colorado, post office opened on June 26, 1889. The town was named for Ute Pass between the Arkansas River watershed and the Missouri River watershed.

== Geography ==
Divide sits on the north slope of Pikes Peak. Ute Pass is immediately west of town. Divide is located at the western intersection of U.S. Highway 24 and State Highway 67 (The highways overlap east to Woodland Park).

The Divide CDP has an area of 215 acres (0.869 km^{2}), all land.

=== Climate ===
Climate data for Divide 4NW, Colorado, 1991–2020 normals: 9134ft (2784m)
Month	Jan	Feb	Mar	Apr	May	Jun	Jul	Aug	Sep	Oct	Nov	Dec	Year
Mean daily maximum °F (°C)	32.7 (0.4)	34.4 (1.3)	41.3 (5.2)	46.8 (8.2)	56.5 (13.6)	68.5 (20.3)	74.3 (23.5)	71.4 (21.9)	65.3 (18.5)	53.6 (12.0)	41.5 (5.3)	32.6 (0.3)	51.6 (10.9)
Daily mean °F (°C)	21.0 (−6.1)	22.5 (−5.3)	29.4 (−1.4)	34.7 (1.5)	43.9 (6.6)	54.9 (12.7)	60.5 (15.8)	58.1 (14.5)	51.9 (11.1)	40.4 (4.7)	29.7 (−1.3)	22.4 (−5.3)	39.1 (4.0)
Mean daily minimum °F (°C)	9.3 (−12.6)	10.5 (−11.9)	17.5 (−8.1)	22.6 (−5.2)	31.2 (−0.4)	41.2 (5.1)	46.6 (8.1)	44.7 (7.1)	38.5 (3.6)	27.1 (−2.7)	17.8 (−7.9)	12.3 (−10.9)	26.6 (−3.0)
Average precipitation inches (mm)	0.66 (17)	0.74 (19)	1.45 (37)	2.10 (53)	2.03 (52)	1.77 (45)	3.72 (94)	3.24 (82)	1.90 (48)	0.94 (24)	0.69 (18)	0.74 (19)	19.98 (508)
Average snowfall inches (cm)	10.1 (26)	16.6 (42)	14.8 (38)	19.3 (49)	10.9 (28)	0.5 (1.3)	trace	trace	1.0 (2.5)	5.7 (14)	9.4 (24)	11.0 (28)	99.3 (252.8)
Source 1: NOAA
Source 2: XMACIS (snowfall)

== Demographics ==
The United States Census Bureau initially defined the Divide CDP for the United States Census 2010.

Divide CDP, Colorado
Year	Pop.	±%
2010	127	—
2020	143	+12.6%
Source: United States Census Bureau

== Education ==
It is in the Woodland Park School District RE-2.

== See also ==
- Front Range Urban Corridor
