= Cripple Creek Gold Rush =

The Cripple Creek Gold Rush was a period of gold production in the Cripple Creek area from the late 1800s until the early 1900s. Mining exchanges were in Cripple Creek, Colorado Springs, Pueblo and Victor. Smelting was in Gillett, Florence, and (Old) Colorado City. Mining communities sprang up quickly, but most lasted only as long as gold continued to be produced. Settlements included:

- Alta Vista - founded in 1894 three miles south of Victor, site of the narrow gauge classification yard, abandoned in 1912 with the closure of the Florence & Cripple Creek Railroad.
- Altman - Founded in 1893 at 10,620 feet elevation between Bull Hill and Bull Cliff, near the Pharmacist, Deadwood, Zenobia, Burns, South Burns, Isabella, Buena Vista and Victor gold mines. Population peaked by 1897 at 2,000. Largely abandoned by 1910.
- Anaconda - Founded in 1893 in Squaw Gulch, near the Anaconda, Mary McKinney, Morning Glory, Chicken Hawk, Dolly Varden and Doctor Jack Pot gold mines. Highest population was about 1,000 in 1900. Destroyed by fire in 1904.
- Arequa - Oldest townsite in the Cripple Creek District, founded before 1890 between Beacon Hill and Squaw Mountain.
- Barry - Founded in 1891 in Squaw Gulch. Highest population was a few hundred in 1893. Abandoned by 1900 after gold ore processing mills closed.
- Bull Hill - Site of the classification yards of the Midland Terminal Railway from 1894 to 1949.
- Cripple Creek
- Cameron - Founded in 1900, home of Pinnacle Park amusement park, served by both the Midland Terminal Railway and Colorado Springs & Cripple Creek District Railway, abandoned by 1910.
- Eclipse - Grew at the bottom of the gulch at the Economic Gold Extraction Company chlorination process gold extraction mill, at the end of the tunnel from the Gold Coin mine through Squaw Mountain. The mill and town burned in 1908.
- Elkton - Grew up adjacent to the Elkton and Cresson gold mines from 1893 until about 1916. In 1904 the town had a population of 2,500. All three railroads, the Florence & Cripple Creek, Midland Terminal, and Colorado Springs & Cripple Creek, passed through Elkton.
- Gillett - Active community between 1894 and 1905. Residents mostly worked for the nearby Cripple Creek Cyanide Company gold extraction mill or the Midland Terminal Railway. Site of the only bullfight held in the US, in 1895.
- Goldfield - Founded in 1895 by the owners of Portland gold mine at the foot of Battle Mountain and Bull Hill. Population grew to 3,500 by 1900.
- Independence - Founded in 1894 near the Independence Mine on the south slope of Battle Mountain, in proximity to the Hull City, Vindicator, and Findley gold mines. The town reached approximately 500 residents by 1900 and was the site of the 1904 depot bombing during the Colorado Labor Wars.
- Lawrence - Founded in 1892 along Wilson Creek, south of the location where Victor would later be built. Site of a gold extraction mill, brick yard, and slaughterhouse.
- Midway - At 10,487 feet elevation, adjacent to the Vista Grande stop of the Golden Circle Railroad used by miners working at the Wild Horse and Bull Hill gold mines.
- Mound City - Settled in 1891 around a cluster of gold ore processing mills at the confluence of Squaw Gulch and Cripple Creek, south of Cripple Creek town, deserted by 1900.
- Victor
- Winfield - Also known as Summit or Stratton, a company town built in 1900 by Winfield Scott Stratton, owner of the Independence gold mine.

== See also ==
- Timeline of mining in Colorado
- Pike's Peak Gold Rush
