= Irving Howbert =

American businessman, mine owner and politician

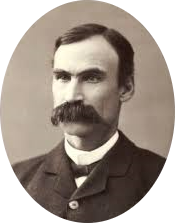
- Born: April 11, 1846; Columbus, Indiana
- Died: December 22, 1934 (aged 88); Colorado Springs, Colorado
- Occupations: Businessman, mine owner, and politician
- Known for: Helping to build Old Colorado City and Colorado Springs, Colorado and philanthropist

Irving Howbert (April 11, 1846 – December 22, 1934) was a pioneer of the Pikes Peak region, businessman, investor, politician, and philanthropist. He helped William Jackson Palmer establish the municipality of Colorado Springs. As county clerk and recorder, as well as a real estate agent, he sought and attained land for what would become Colorado Springs. Investments in mines and railways fostered the mining industry and transportation of ore.

As a young man, Howbert fought in the Sand Creek massacre while serving the 3rd Colorado Cavalry Regiment.

== Early life and marriage ==
On April 11, 1846, Irving Howbert was the first of eight children born to Martha, née Marshall, and William Howbert. He was born and lived his first eight years in Columbus, Bartholomew County, Indiana. He then lived and was educated in Iowa beginning in 1852.

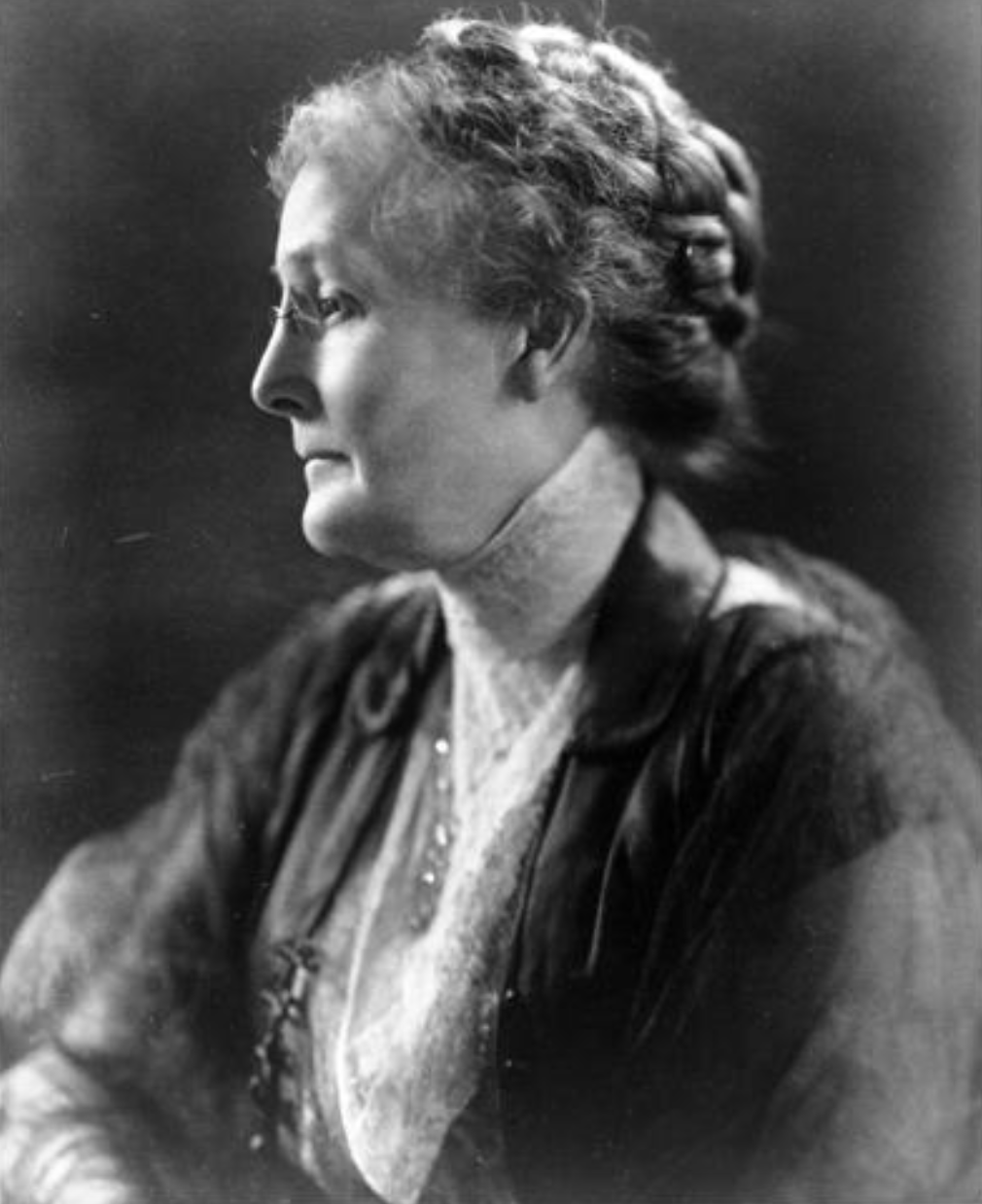
Lizzie Howbert, wife of Irving Howbert of Colorado Springs, about 1905

Howbert's father was a missionary for the Methodist Episcopal Church and he first traveled to Colorado in 1860. The following year, the Howberts unsuccessfully panned for gold on Tarryall Creek. (Note: Tarryall Creek is located in Park County, Colorado.) Also in 1861, the family moved to Old Colorado City, Colorado. The Howberts established a farm nearby on Cheyenne Creek in 1862. Howbert's mother died in 1863.

Howbert served for six months during the American Civil War, when he volunteered to serve the 3rd Colorado Cavalry Regiment from 1864 to 1865. During that time, he fought at the Sand Creek massacre.

In 1864, Howbert and other men captured a group of Utes, when the Utes tried to run away Howbert and others shot and killed six men. Over six months from 1864 to 1865, Howbert served the 3rd Colorado Cavalry Regiment. (Note: Howbert described the following activity, which may be related, a group of Utes, with a leader Chipeta, camped in Cheyenne Cañon. They stole horses from Plain Indians and moved them west from northern Cheyenne Mountain. They traveled near what became the route of the future Midland Terminal Railway, also known as the Cripple Creek Short Line.)

After his military service, he settled in Colorado Territory, where he worked several years in a number of positions, farmer, cowboy herding cattle, freighter, and general store clerk. Howbert married Lizzie A. Copeland from Illinois in 1874 and they had two children.

== Career ==
Howbert, described as the "dean of Colorado bankers and pioneer of Colorado Springs" and "dean of Pikes Peak region pioneers and historians" in newspapers, began having a prominent role in development of the Colorado Springs area beginning in 1878. (Note: Manly Ormes said in The Book of Colorado Springs that Howbert was among "the pioneers whose personality has been a dominating factor in shaping our destiny as a town.")

=== The city of Colorado Springs ===
Howbert helped William Jackson Palmer found the city of Colorado Springs. He served as the clerk and recorder of El Paso County, Colorado from 1869 to 1879. Along with Matt France, he was a real estate agent, purchasing land for Colorado Springs and Old Colorado City. He also acquired land for the Fountain Colony. County clerk Howbert issued the paperwork to establish the city of Colorado Springs. To encourage interest in the town, Howbert led the effort for the creation of the Ute Pass Wagon Road to the mining camps in South Park.

During that ten-year period, he also assumed the responsibility of county assessor, treasurer, and the work of three commissioners. Apparently, the people who had the positions lived too far away or other reasons for being unable to fulfill their duties.

Howbert stopped working for the county in 1879 so that he could devote himself to his work at the First National Bank of Colorado Springs.

Howbert chaired a committee to acquire water rights of Beaver Creek in 1890. The creek is on land where Colorado Springs reservoirs were constructed in 1882 on Pikes Peak.

=== Bank, railroad, and mining industries ===
Howbert helped incorporate the First National Bank of Colorado Springs in 1874. He worked for two years as a cashier beginning in 1878. He was president for ten years. He retired as president in 1923 and continued to assist the bank for years.

Howbert invested in the Colorado Midland Railway, Colorado Springs and Cripple Creek Railway (also known as the Short Line), and development of the Cripple Creek district. In 1878, the Howbert invested in the creation of the Robert E. Lee mine in Leadville mining district, which "laid the foundation for his fortune."

During the Cripple Creek miners' strike of 1894, miners engaged in lawlessness in El Paso County, Colorado. At the same time, the strikers built formidable defenses and munitions on Bull Hill in Cripple Creek to fight against mine owners. Without a viable plan to manage the fight against the miners, Howbert offered a plan that brought 120 former firefighters and policemen from Denver to fight for the mine owners. The men were brought in on trains and deputized by the El Paso County Sheriffs department. On May 25, 1894, the armed deputies traveled by train to the Victor area and towards Bull Hill. Once they were near the Strong Mine shaft, the deputies were fired upon by the miners. The men were overwhelmed by the damage done to the Strong Mine shaft and its steam boiler. They covered their heads as debris descended upon them and the train was driven in reverse to withdraw from the area. This emboldened the miners whose strike intentions "degenerated into a futile class war". The miners destroyed and took over mines in the area, starting with the Independence Mine. Howbert hired 200 more men from Leadville and Denver and up to 1200 men were deputized to fight against 700 miners, but the miners had a strategic location and dynamite. After a number of ill-fated attempts to take Bull Hill, the state militia was brought in and ended the conflict.

A devastating and fast-burning fire engulfed much of Cripple Creek, "a town of tinderbox of desiccated wood", on April 25, 1896. Fifteen hundred people were left homeless by the accidental fire. Another fire followed four days later at the Portland Hotel. It was also a destructive fire. The number of homeless rose to 5,000 people. On the heals of the other fire, lack of housewares, and food led to looting. Many people chose to leave the town. Hobert, Spencer Penrose, Winfield Scott Stratton, and Verner Z. Reed immediately established a relief committee and filled a two-car special train and two dozen freight wagons with food, tents, blankets, diapers that was sent to Cripple Creek. About 3,000 people found lodging on their own and 2,000 lived in tents and had two large meals a day. Other trains followed with other essential goods. The town rebuilt better than before and it improved the relationships between the miners and the mine owners for the capitalist's timely and significant relief efforts.

Realizing that gold ore processing mills were more profitable than gold mines, Howbert invested in the Colorado-Philadelphia Reduction Company along with Penrose, Stratton, and others in 1896. Ore was delivered on the Midland Terminal Railway, founded based upon Howbert's concept, to the Midland Terminal Railroad Roundhouse, near the chlorination process mill.

Howbert sat on the board of directors for the Colorado Midway Railway. He was president of the Colorado Springs and Cripple Creek Railway from 1899 to 1905, when it was purchased by the Colorado and Southern Railway. Howbert was kept on as a director.

=== Politician ===
From 1882 to 1886, Howbert served as a Republican state senator. He was a delegate to the National Republican Committee in 1888. By 1894, he chaired the Republican State Central Committee.

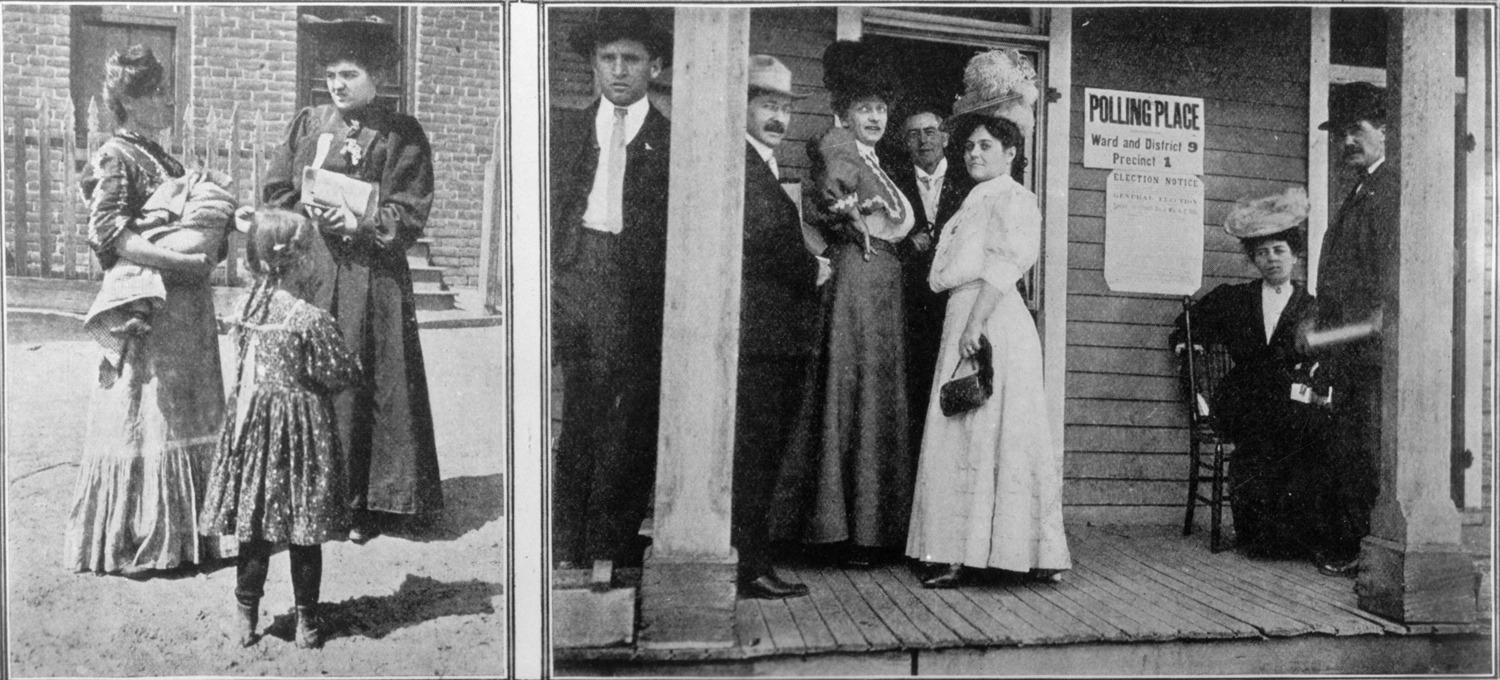
Men and women outside a polling station in Colorado 1893, following the 1893 Colorado women's suffrage referendum

On July 17 of that year, Howbert oversaw the development of the goal or intention: "It is hoped that the republican women of the state will actively participate in all primaries, and that they will be fully recognized in the selection of delegates to this and other conventions of the part." Colorado was the first state in the country to secure voting rights for its women during the November 7, 1893 referendum on women's suffrage.

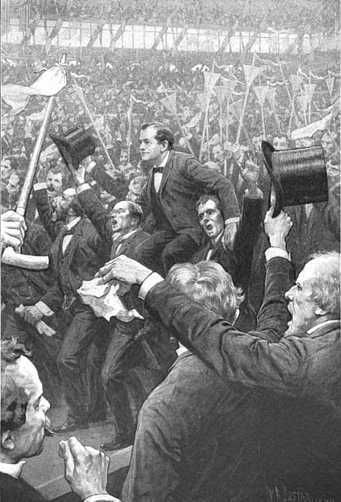
William Jennings Bryan being carried on the shoulders of delegates after giving the Cross of Gold speech on July 9, 1896

Discussions became "spirited" among the committee members on July 29 as Edward O. Wolcott lobbied for selection of William McKinley as a candidate for the 1896 United States presidential election. Howbert resigned as chairman the next day, stating that it was to accommodate his trip to Europe. (Note: He had lived in Europe for his health for 15 months in 1888 and 1889.) J. L. Hodges — a supporter of McKinley and the continued use of the gold standard — replaced Howbert as chairman of the Republican State Central Committee.

=== College board member and regent ===
Howbert sat on the Colorado College board of trustees from 1880 to 1922, including sitting on the Executive, Finance, Instruction, Auditing, and Investment Committees. He chaired several of the committees. He was an interim regent of the University of Colorado.

=== Author and relationship with Native Americans ===
He wrote the books The Indians of the Pike's Peak Region and Memories of a Lifetime in the Park's Peak Region. He was a contributor to the Report of the Park Commission of Colorado Springs.

After the Utes were forced to reservations, Howbert traveled in 1912 with a group of Ute people along Ute Pass to their ancestral lands. (Note: The Utes ranged and camped in the Manitou Springs and Garden of the Gods area. A group of about 1,000 Utes, led by Colorow and Chaveno [Shavano], spent the winter of 1866–1867, in the Garden of the Gods and Manitou Springs.) (Note: Ute Pass was an important route for the Utes, who traveled from trading centers at Taos and Santa Fe, New Mexico, through San Luis Valley in Colorado north to the Manitou Springs area, where the pass begins, up to South Park where they hunted buffalo and fought Plains Indians who tried to secure the lands from the Utes.) At the time, Howbert was chairman of the El Paso County Pioneer Society and led an event on August 30, 1912, to celebrate the burial of a time capsule, including ceremonial dances performed by Utes on ancestral sacred land. The event was held at Soda Springs Park in Manitou Springs, Colorado and then traveled west along Ute Pass to mark the ancient trail. (Note: The springs at Manitou Springs, Garden of the Gods, and Pikes Peak were sacred to the Utes.)

== Personal life, philanthropy, and death ==
Howbert was a member of the El Paso Masonry Lodge No. 13 for 64 years. He collected fossils in Colorado, donating them to a college in Ohio. From the fortune that he made on the Robert E. Lee mine, Howbert funded the construction of the Opera House along with J.F. Humphrey and B.F. Crowell. It was completed in 1881. After the Opera House was constructed, the Masonry Lodge was located on the third floor. With E.T. Stone and B.F. Crowell, Howbert sought land for a cemetery for lodge members.

Howbert died on December 22, 1934 and was buried at Evergreen Cemetery in Colorado Springs. An elementary school in the city was named for him.

== Sources ==
- Anderson, Eugene L (1967). El Paso Lodge No. 13, A.F. & A.M. : 100 years of Masonry in El Paso Lodge, 1867-1967. El Paso Lodge No. 13.
- Colorado College (1914). Fortieth Annual Catalogue of Colorado College. Colorado Springs: Board of Trustees of Colorado College.
- Kaelin, Celinda Reynolds (2008). American Indians of the Pikes Peak Region. Charleston, SC : Arcadia Pub. ISBN 978-0-7385-4847-0.
- Sprague, Marshall (2016-09-09). Money Mountain: The Story of Cripple Creek Gold. CreateSpace Independent Publishing Platform (previously published by Ballantine Books in 1971). ISBN 978-1-5375-5839-4.
- Sprague, Marshall (1971). Newport in the Rockies; the life and good times of Colorado Springs. Chicago, Sage Books. ISBN 978-0-8040-0068-0.
