= Cripple Creek Historic District =

Historic district in Colorado, United States

- U.S. National Register of Historic Places
- U.S. National Historic Landmark District
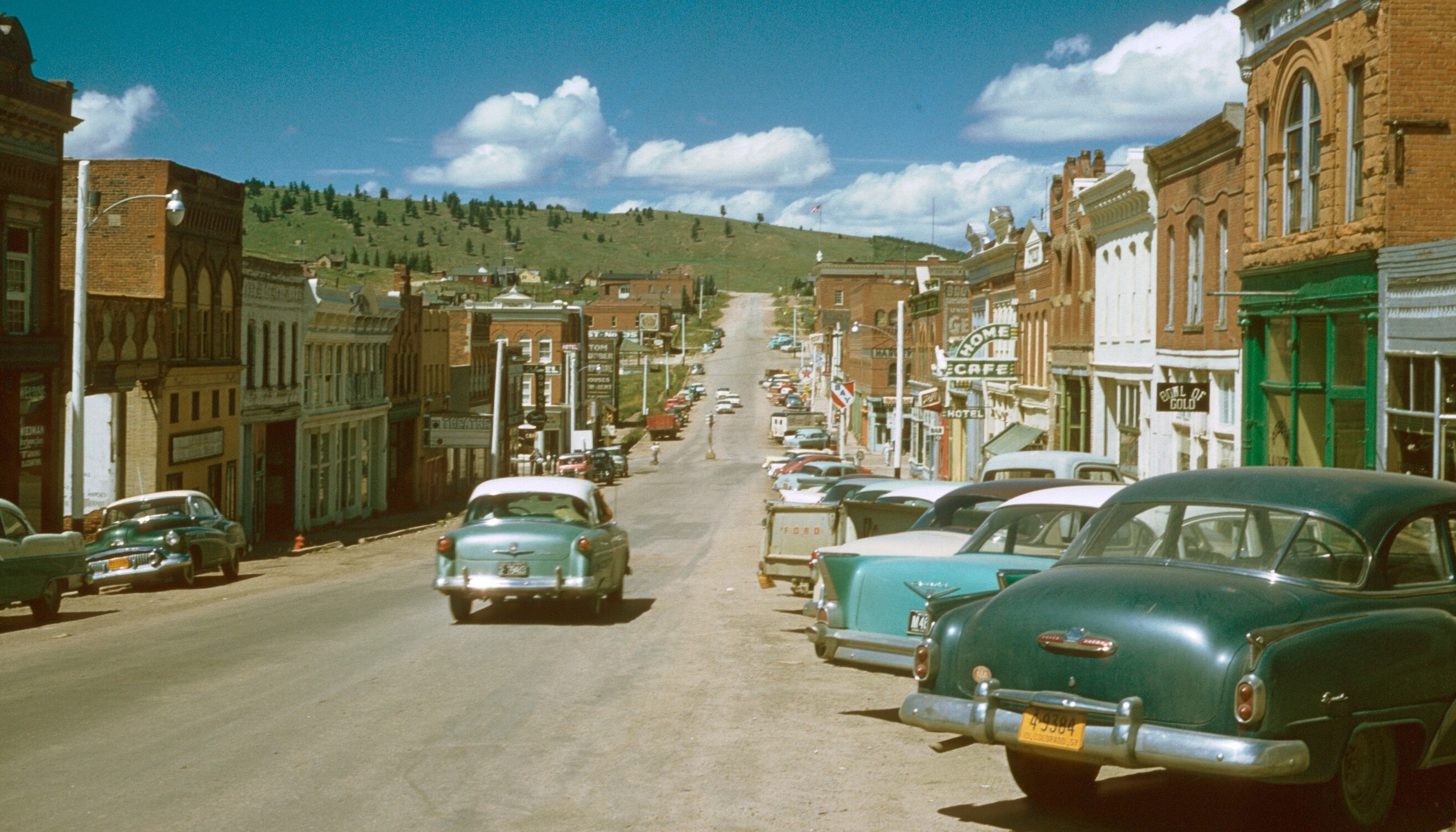
- Cripple Creek, 1957

- Location within Colorado Location within the United States
- Location: Cripple Creek, Colorado
- Coordinates: 38°45′7″N 105°10′31″W
- Area: 2,300 acres (930 ha)
- Built: 1890
- NRHP reference No.: 66000939

Significant dates
- Added to NRHP: October 15, 1966
- Designated NHLD: July 4, 1961

Cripple Creek Historic District is a historic district including Cripple Creek, Colorado, United States and is significant for its gold mining era history. It developed as a gold mining center beginning in 1890, with a number of buildings from that period surviving to this day. A majority of the business district as it exists today was rebuilt after two devastating fires in April 1896. The mines in the area were among the most successful, producing millions of dollars of gold in the 1890s and supporting a population of 25,000 at its peak. It was declared a National Historic Landmark in 1961.

Many Cripple Creek buildings post-date the gold mining era. The district includes a number of structures that survive from that era:

- The Midland Terminal Depot
- Teller County Courthouse
- The Imperial Hotel
- The Old Homestead
- St. Paul's Catholic Church
- Mansard Roof House, on Warren Avenue
- The Teller County Hospital, a brick Greek Revival-style two-story building.

The boundary of the district is defined by high points around Cripple Creek to include the "natural setting reminiscent of the historic environment. Additionally, it encloses part of the extent of Poverty Gulch where some of the original ore discoveries were made as well as the County Hospital building which is located outside the town limits." (p. 10) It runs from the peak of Mineral Hill (elevation 10,255 feet) southwest to a peak (elevation 9,855 feet), then to northeast corner of Mount Pisgah cemetery, then south along the east border of the cemetery to its southeast corner, then southeast to the peak that is 1600 feet to the northwest of Signal Hill (at elevation 9731), then northeast to the summit of Globe Hill (elevation 10,436), then northwest to peak of Carbonate Hill (elevation 10,335), finally east back to the peak of Mineral Hill.

State Highway 67 is the principal road through the area.

== See also ==
- Cripple Creek & Victor Narrow Gauge Railroad
- National Register of Historic Places listings in Teller County, Colorado
