= Old Colorado City Branch Carnegie Library =

Historic library in Colorado Springs, Colorado, U.S.

Old Colorado City Library
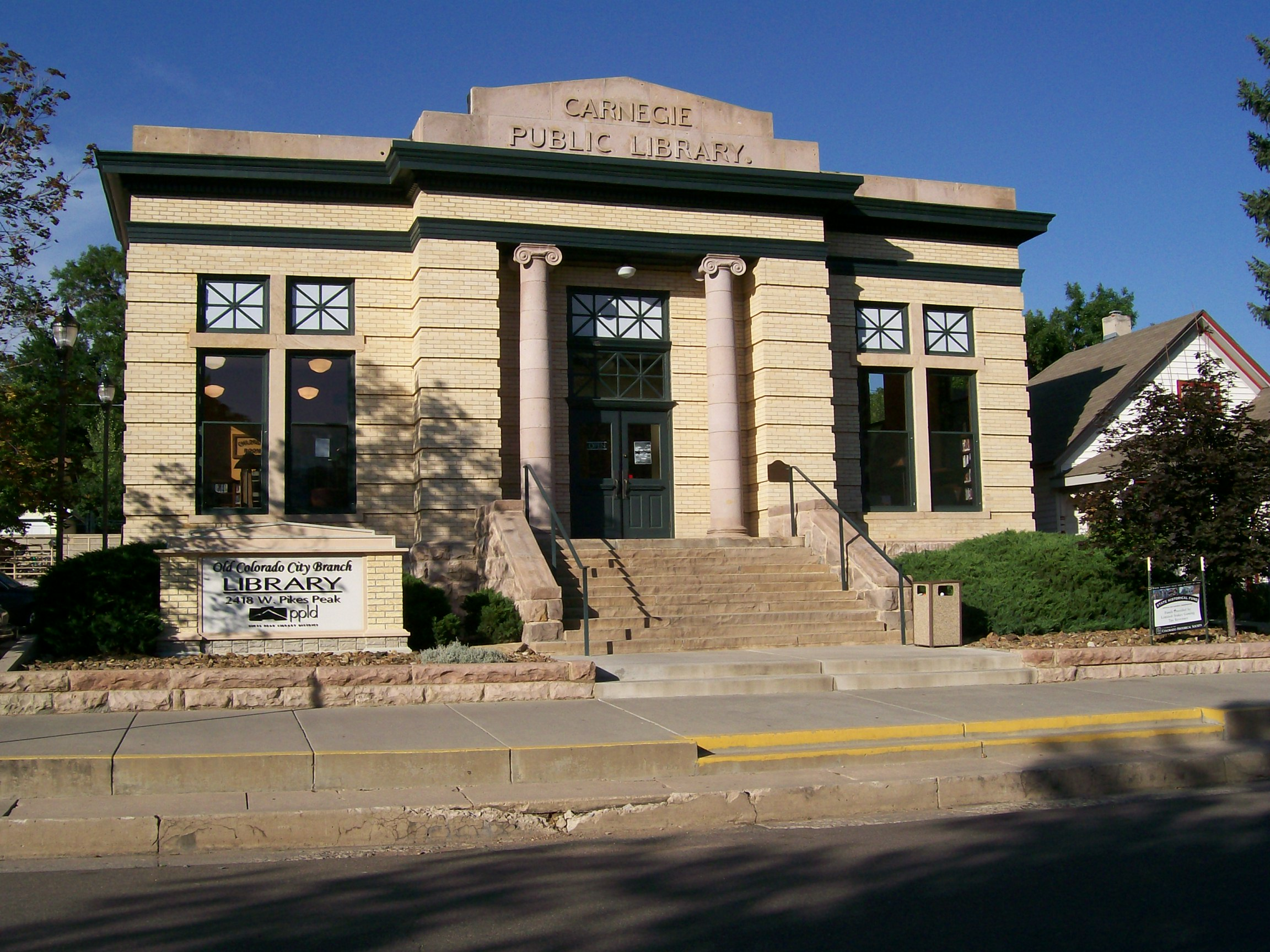
- Old Colorado City Library in 2010
- 38.8476472546556°N 104.86105677466409°W
- Location: 2418 West Pikes Peak Avenue, Colorado Springs, Colorado, U.S.
- Established: 1904; 122 years ago
- Branch of: Pikes Peak Library District

The Old Colorado City Library is a currently operating branch library of the Pikes Peak Library District. It is housed in a 1904 Carnegie Library that has been in continuous service as a library since opening December 7, 1904. The library is located at 2418 West Pikes Peak Avenue, Colorado Springs, Colorado, 80904, in the historic district of Old Colorado City.

== History ==
About 1868, citizens of Colorado City showed an interest in building a library and gained sufficient funds to buy a small collection of books. On January 7, 1896, the Women's Christian Temperance Union of Colorado City formally opened and dedicated a library they called the Woods Free Library, named after Mrs. Lydia Woods of Manitou Springs, Colorado, who had donated $1,000 to purchase books. In 1901, the library was moved to the Templeton Building at 8 South 25th Street. In 1904, a new library on West Pikes Peak Avenue was opened, because of a gift from Andrew Carnegie.

When Colorado City was annexed to the city of Colorado Springs in 1917, the library board of directors sold its invested rights and interests to the Colorado Springs Public Library for $1, and it became the West End Branch. In May 1977, it was rededicated as the Old Colorado City Branch Library to reflect the resurgence of historical interest in the area. The 1904 Carnegie building - now part of the Old Colorado City Historic District - was renovated in 1980, and received additional parking and handicapped access in 1994. A renovation campaign was launched in early 2003 to preserve its historic architecture.

== Timeline ==
A timeline of key events follows:

- 1895: The first library in Colorado City was started by the Woman's Christian Temperance Union.
- 1896: Mrs. Lydia Woods donated $1,000 for the collection and the library was named for her.
- 1901: The Woods Library moved into the Templeton building, which still stands on the corner of Colorado Avenue and 25th Street.
- 1902: Mr. Beyle of the Colorado City Chamber of Commerce wrote to Andrew Carnegie about funding a library building.
- 1903: The Woods Library became the Woods Free Library when it dropped membership fees.
- 1903: In January, the Chamber received word from Mr. Carnegie that he would donate $10,000 for a building if the city provided the land and $1,000 a year for operating expenses. Several sites were proposed, including land near the shops at Midland and Bancroft school. Property was purchased from the Christian Church for $2,600.
- 1903: George M. Bryson was named as the architect and a Carnegie Library Board was named. Work progressed on the building throughout 1904.
- 1904: In November, the Carnegie Library Board turned control of the building over to the Woods Free Library, which moved its collection into the new building.
- 1904: The Carnegie Library opened its doors to the public on December 7.
- 1917: Colorado City was annexed by Colorado Springs, and the Carnegie Library and its contents were sold to the Colorado Springs Public Library Board of Directors for $1. It was named the West End Branch.
- 1977: West End Branch was renamed the Old Colorado City Branch.
- 1980: The building was remodeled.
- 1982: The Carnegie Library was named a contributing building to the Old Colorado City Historic District.
- 1992: The last major improvement to the building - a parking lot - was added to meet the needs of increased patron use.
- 2004: 100th anniversary of library opening. Fund raising campaign begins for restoration.
- 2007: Library closed for renovation April 28. Reopened October 23.
