= Colorado Springs and Cripple Creek District Railway =

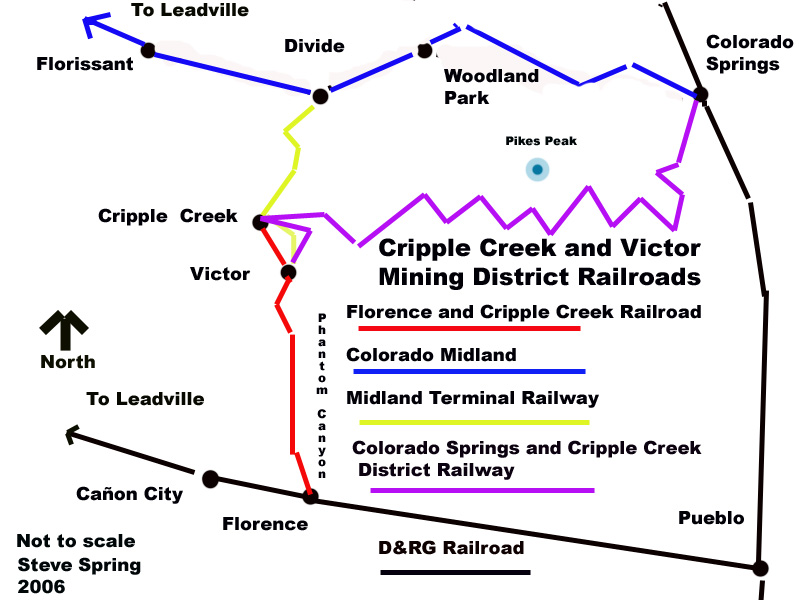

Overview
- Locale: Colorado
- Dates of operation: 1897–1920

Technical
- Track gauge: 4 ft 8 1/2 in (1,435 mm) standard gauge

The Colorado Springs and Cripple Creek District Railway was a 4 ft 8 1/2 in (1,435 mm) standard gauge railroad operating in the U.S. state of Colorado around the turn of the 20th century.

== History ==
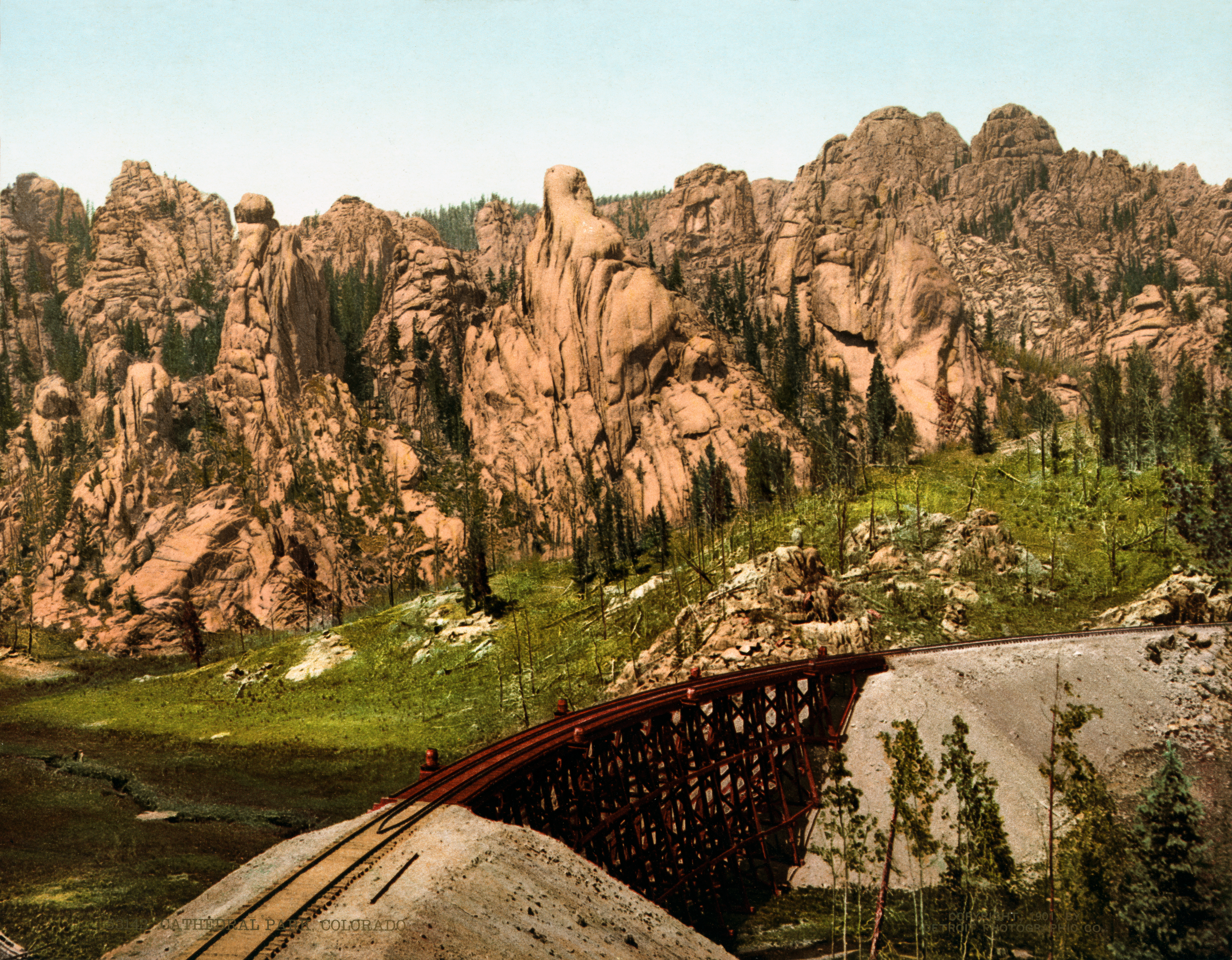
Track along current Gold Camp Rd, CR 8, 1901

On April 13, 1897, Lucian D. Ross, Thomas Burk, James L. Lindsay, W.T. Doubt and Kurnel R. Babbitt organized the Cripple Creek District Railway Company to operate a 6.25-mile (10.06 km) 4 ft 8 1/2 in (1,435 mm) standard gauge railway with an overhead line between Cripple Creek and Victor, Colorado. The "Pikes Peak gold rush" of 1859 brought many would-be gold miners to the eastern base of Pikes Peak but only those that went north to Cherry Creek found any minerals that were valuable. The rest went home empty handed and the Pikes Peak region gained a poor reputation as a potential gold area. Finally in 1890, rocks from Bob Womack's persistent digging were assayed in Colorado Springs showing that the rock actually contained gold. This led to the formation of the Cripple Creek Mining District on April 5, 1891.

Better transportation than wagons was urgently needed to access the newly formed mining district. During 1894 a 3 ft (914 mm) narrow-gauge line, known as the Florence and Cripple Creek Railroad was built at a cost of $500,000. The Florence and Cripple Creek Railroad extended forty miles (64 km) and reached the district from the Arkansas River to the south in 1894. This was quickly followed by the 4 ft 8 1/2 in (1,435 mm) standard gauge Midland Terminal Railway coming from a connection with the Colorado Midland Railway to the north. This one was thirty miles (48 km) long and cost $25,000 per mile to construct. The two railroads, competitive at first, joined forces forming a monopoly. Mine owners with mills in Colorado City adjacent to Colorado Springs organized and built The Colorado Springs and Cripple Creek Railroad or "Short Line" traversing the south slope of Pikes Peak. The new railroad was able to force freight rates downward accelerating production. At peak capacity, the Midland Terminal Railway operated ten trains a day. One train carried parlor cars and sleepers and offered champagne dinners on overnight excursions from Denver. Freight cars hauled coal, lumber, explosives, machinery, fruit and other luxuries. Outbound, the same cars carried ore for delivery to reduction mills, such as the Golden Cycle, Standard, Telluride, and Portland mills at the western edge of Colorado Springs. The name was changed to Colorado Springs and Cripple Creek District Railway on November 17, 1899. An extension to Colorado Springs opened in April 1901. The Colorado and Southern Railway directed operations from 1904 to 1911.

Losing money due to competition from the Florence and Cripple Creek Railway and the Midland Terminal Railway, the Colorado and Southern Railway leased the Colorado Springs and Cripple Creek District Railway to the Florence and Cripple Creek in 1911. In 1915 this lease was transferred to the Cripple Creek Central Railway, which also controlled the Midland Terminal Railway.

By 1917 most rail traffic in the area was directed to the Midland Terminal Railway. The loss of the Bear Creek Bridge in May 1918 cut off all direct traffic from Colorado Springs. Bankruptcy was declared in 1919, at which time it went into receivership. All operations ceased in 1920 and the line was sold for scrap.

A signboard posted on Gold Camp Road near one of the three remaining tunnels that are still used on the road, (#1, #2 and #9), reads as follows: The Midland Terminal Railway, (which wound its way from Colorado Springs to Cripple creek by way of Divide) dominated the shipment of freight and Ore, forcing the CS&CCD out of business by 1920. W.D. Corley, a Colorado Springs coal mine owner and cattle breeder, bought the bankrupt RR for $370,000. It was renamed the Corley Mountain Highway at that time. Corley removed all the tracks, installed toll booths at both ends and opened the Corley mountain highway in 1926. This breath-taking mountain highway became a popular tourist attraction and Corley made $400 per day from the $1 per car toll that he charged. Corley operated his toll road on a Special use permit from the Pike national forest. When this permit expired in 1939, the road was turned over to the federal government. That year the Federal Government changed the name to the Gold Camp Road.

== Colorado Springs and Cripple Creek District Railway--Corley Mountain Highway ==
- Colorado Springs and Cripple Creek District Railway--Corley Mountain Highway
- U.S. National Register of Historic Places
- U.S. Historic district
- Location within Colorado Location within the United States
- Nearest city: Colorado Springs, Colorado
- Area: 115.6 acres (46.8 ha)
- Built: 1900
- Architect: Colorado Springs & Cripple Creek RR; Corley, W.D.
- NRHP reference No.: 99000400
- Added to NRHP: March 25, 1999

Colorado Springs and Cripple Creek District Railway—Corley Mountain Highway is a historic district that was put on the National Register of Historic Places in 1999.

This is the railroad that was converted to the Corley Mountain Highway. After it was taken over in 1939 by the US Forest Service, it has been called Gold Camp Road.

== See also ==
- National Register of Historic Places listings in El Paso County, Colorado
