= Gillett, Colorado =

Ghost town in Colorado

Gillett
- Ghost town
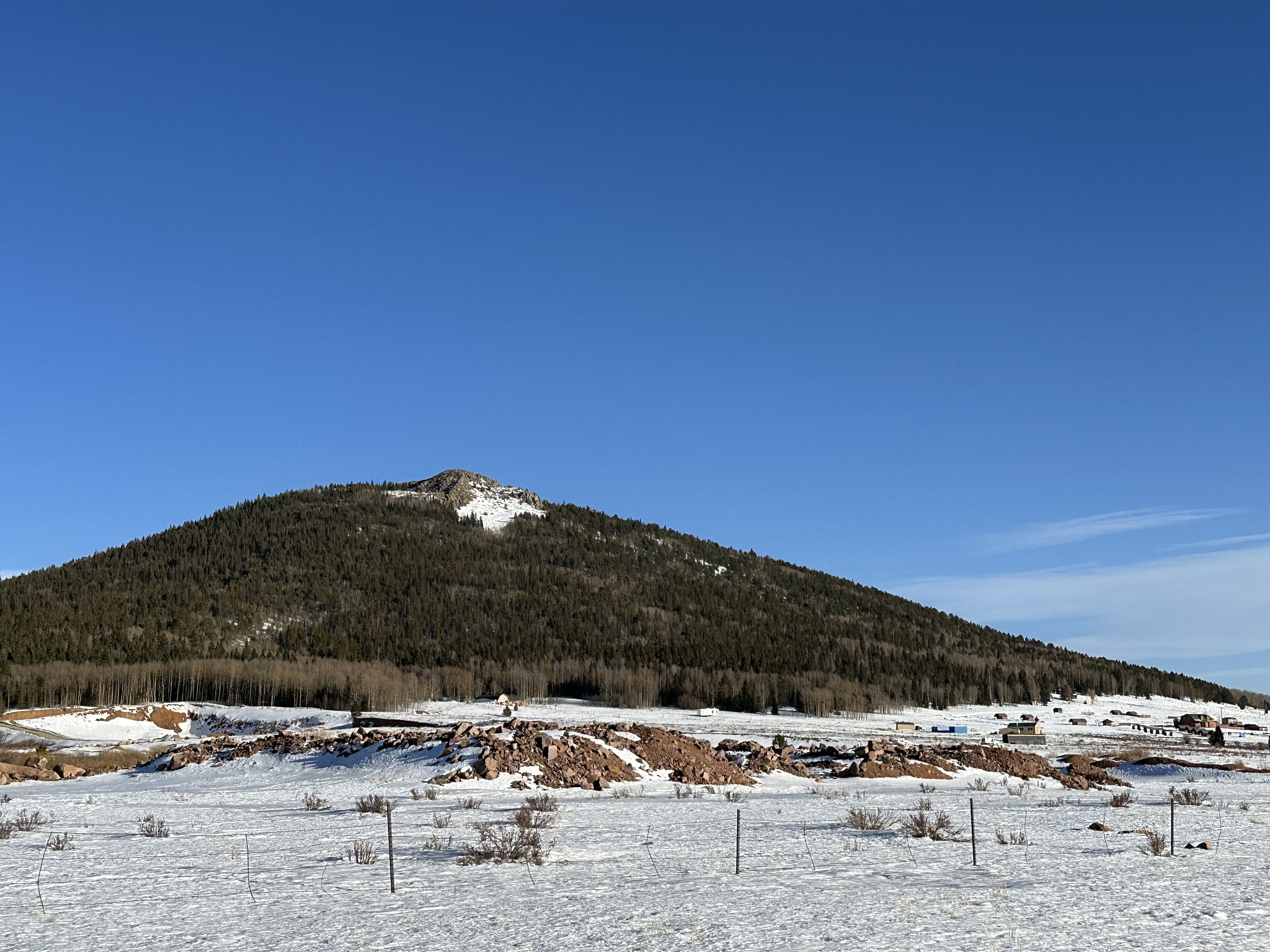
- Site of Gillett, Colorado (2024)

- Location in Colorado
- Coordinates: 38°46′55″N 105°07′22″W
- Country: United States
- State: Colorado
- County: Teller County
- Elevation: 9,938 ft (3,029 m)
- Time zone: UTC-7 (MST)
  - Summer (DST): UTC-6 (MDT)

Gillett is a ghost town in Teller County, Colorado, United States, near Cripple Creek. The site lies in a valley along Colorado State Highway 67 at an elevation of 9,938 feet (3,029 m). Platted in 1894 during the Cripple Creek mining boom, Gillett developed as a rail-related settlement associated with the Midland Terminal Railway. The post office operated from 1894 to 1913. The town declined as local mining and railroad activity waned and was largely abandoned by the mid-20th century. A 1965 flash flood destroyed or removed much of what remained of the town's structures, leaving only scattered ruins and traces of infrastructure. In the late 2010s, a nearby public water stop at Gillette Flats Spring became the subject of a water-rights compliance dispute and related engineering work to keep the spring accessible.

== History ==
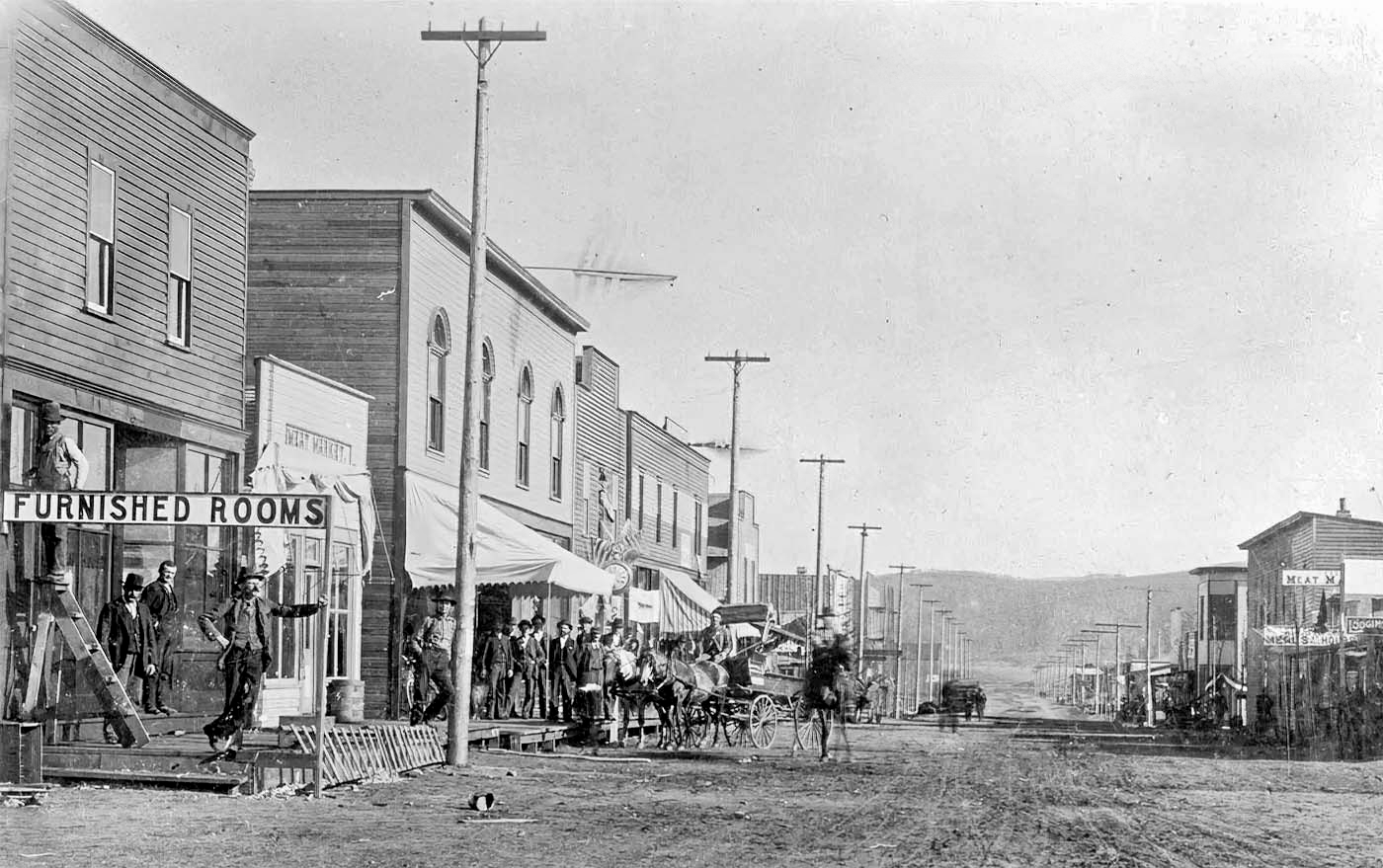
Gillett, Colorado c. 1895

=== Founding and naming ===
Gillett (sometimes misspelled Gillette) underwent two name changes, first becoming known as West Beaver Park, then as Cripple City, and finally being named after William K. Gillett, a railroad man. The town was platted on January 19, 1894, by the Beaver Park Land Company. William K. Gillett's partners, Henry Collbran, Irving Howbert, and Harlan Lillibridge created the Midland Terminal railroad, a branch of Colorado Midland Railroad. In addition to the station being named after him, Engine 1 of the Midland Terminal Railway was also named for the same man, but later was changed to engine 54. William K. Gillett was the company's auditor and served as President/General Manager from 1898 to 1905.

=== Railroad development and town growth ===
The Midland Terminal Railway reached Gillett on July 4, 1894, and the Gillett post office opened later that summer. Early on, passengers and freight often continued between Gillett and the main Cripple Creek district by stage road due to the steep terrain, until additional rail connections were completed. With the decline of gold mining and railroad activity, facilities were moved elsewhere and the town's population fell sharply. By January 1895, a well-designed ore-treatment mill with a capacity of 50 tons per day had been completed at Gillett, a few miles northeast of Cripple Creek.

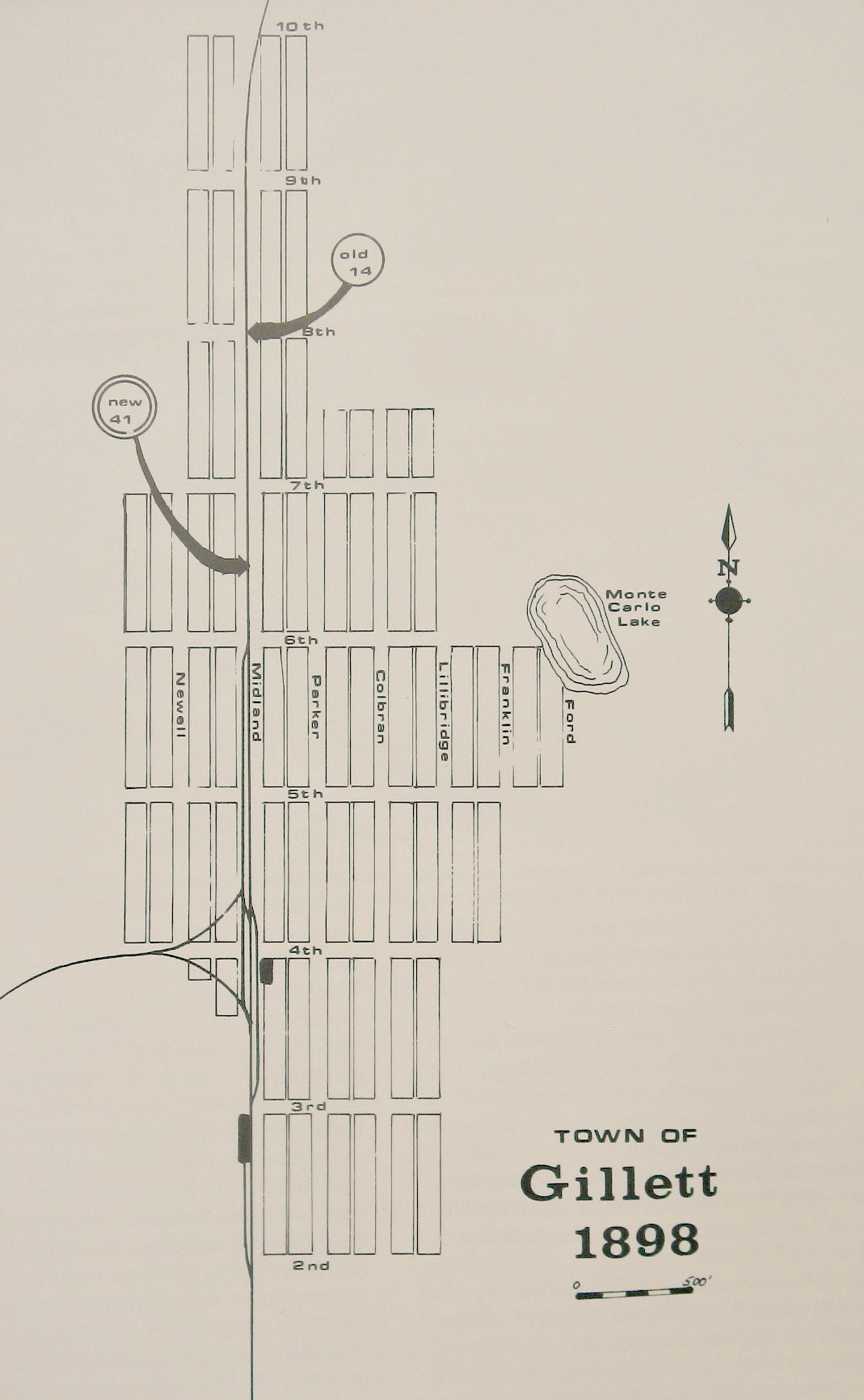
Town map (1898)

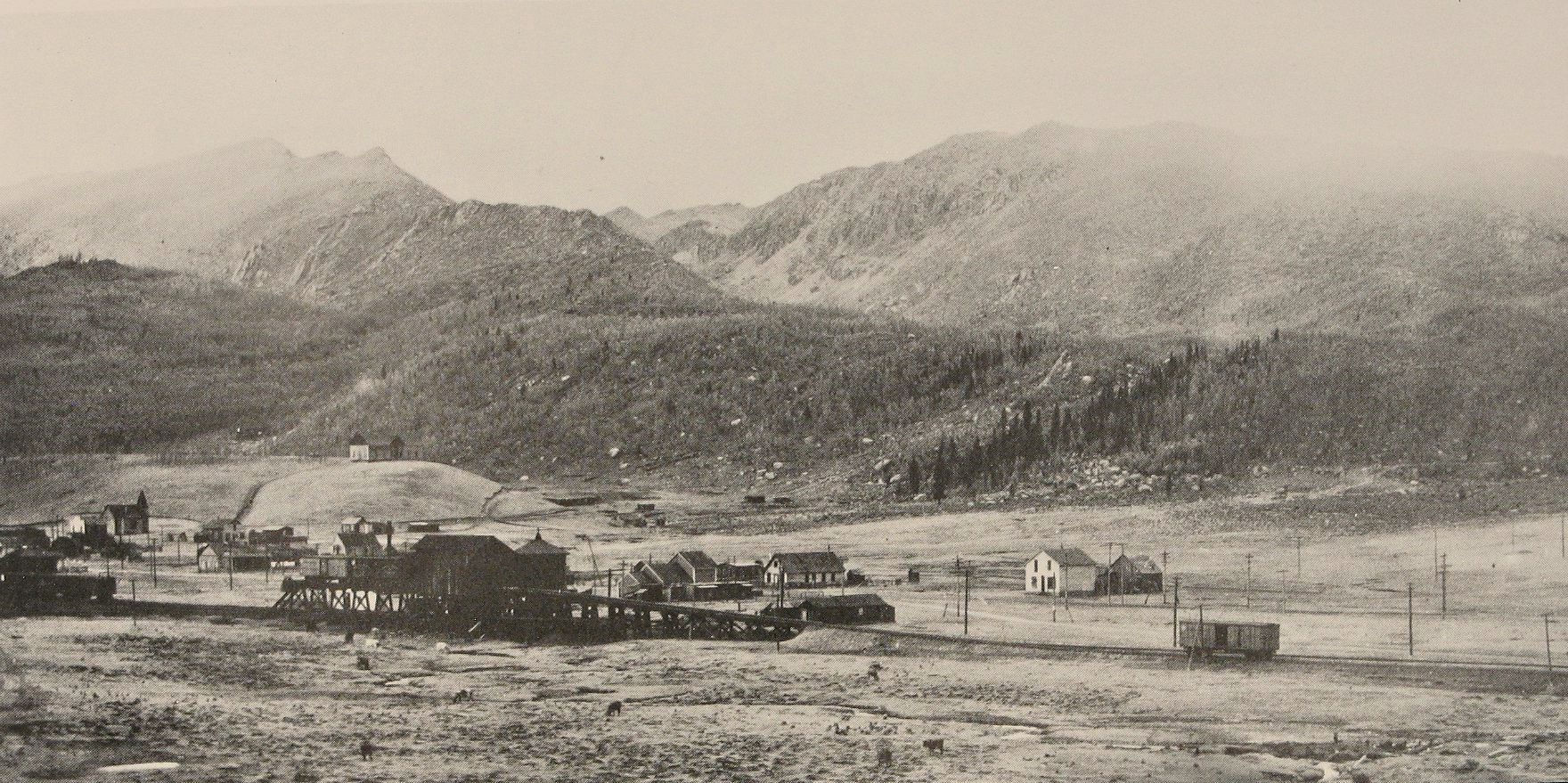
Coal bridge (1910)

==== Community life ====
Contemporary descriptions reported multiple churches and a substantial number of businesses during the town's peak, followed by a steep decline as the district matured and activity shifted. In May 1896, following a fire that destroyed their ballpark, the professional minor league baseball team from Cripple Creek that participated in the Colorado State League moved to Gillett. The team folded at the end of the month. During the first decade of the 1900s, the town began a slow decline and was completely or mostly abandoned by the 1940s.

According to author Jan MacKell Collins, Gillett is the only site of a legal bullfight ever held in the United States. In August 1895, Cripple Creek Palace Hotel owner Joe Wolfe, working with the promoter "Arizona Charlie" Meadows, publicized a three-day Mexican-style bullfight at Gillett's racetrack, advertising it as the first of its kind in the United States and billing Mexican performers including matador Carlos Garcia and a bullfighter billed as "La Charitta." Based on multiple retellings, legal and humane society pressure disrupted the plan to bring fighting bulls across the border, and Wolfe ultimately substituted locally purchased farm bulls for the advertised fighting stock. Estimates of the crowd and what occurred vary widely. Some accounts repeat an attendance figure of 50,000 and describe the spectacle devolving into unrest. Other summaries describe a crowd in the thousands and agree the event was viewed as a failure, with at least one (and possibly two) bulls killed before the remainder was curtailed and canceled. Photographs of the arena and the 1895 event survive in the Denver Public Library and Western Mining History collections (the Denver Public Library captions describe it as the second Mexican-style bullfight in the United States).

==== Flood and destruction ====
In June 1965, intense rainfall and a dam failure up the valley caused a flash flood that swept away much of what remained of the town's structures.

=== Cultural institutions ===
In 1897, Rev. T. Volpe of Cripple Creek organized efforts to build St. Dimas Church at Gillett. Following the town's abandonment, the church was repurposed for agricultural use; the remaining stone walls are among the best-known visible remnants of the site today.

The Midland Terminal Railway played a central role in the town's early development and operations in the district. When the district's mining economy declined, Gillett became a ghost town.

=== Modern notoriety ===
Gillett also had a small airstrip. In an oral history, Eleanor Musser Baker recalled that "they put in an airport at Gillette" and that a plane was kept in an old wooden hangar. Baker added that the airfield was no longer used after a visiting pilot crashed, which she attributed to wind gusts in the area. Soldiers stationed at nearby Fort Carson (Colorado Springs) used to land and subsequently conduct high-altitude survival training near the Gillett airstrip.

During the mid-1970s, Colorado was among the states reporting livestock mutilations and related sightings of low-flying or unmarked helicopters. Unmarked helicopters were often reported before and after the mutilations. A retrospective account in The Fort Morgan Times, drawing on contemporaneous local reporting, described multiple 1975 reports of helicopter activity in proximity to suspected mutilations in northeast Colorado, including law enforcement responses and citizen pursuits. A compilation by Thomas R. Adams summarized recurring claims of helicopters without identifying markings appearing in temporal and geographic proximity to mutilation reports. In 1976, during a period when cattle mutilation reports were especially prolific in the southwestern United States and near the Cripple Creek area, a motorist photographed an unmarked helicopter close to the Gillett airstrip.

== Geography ==
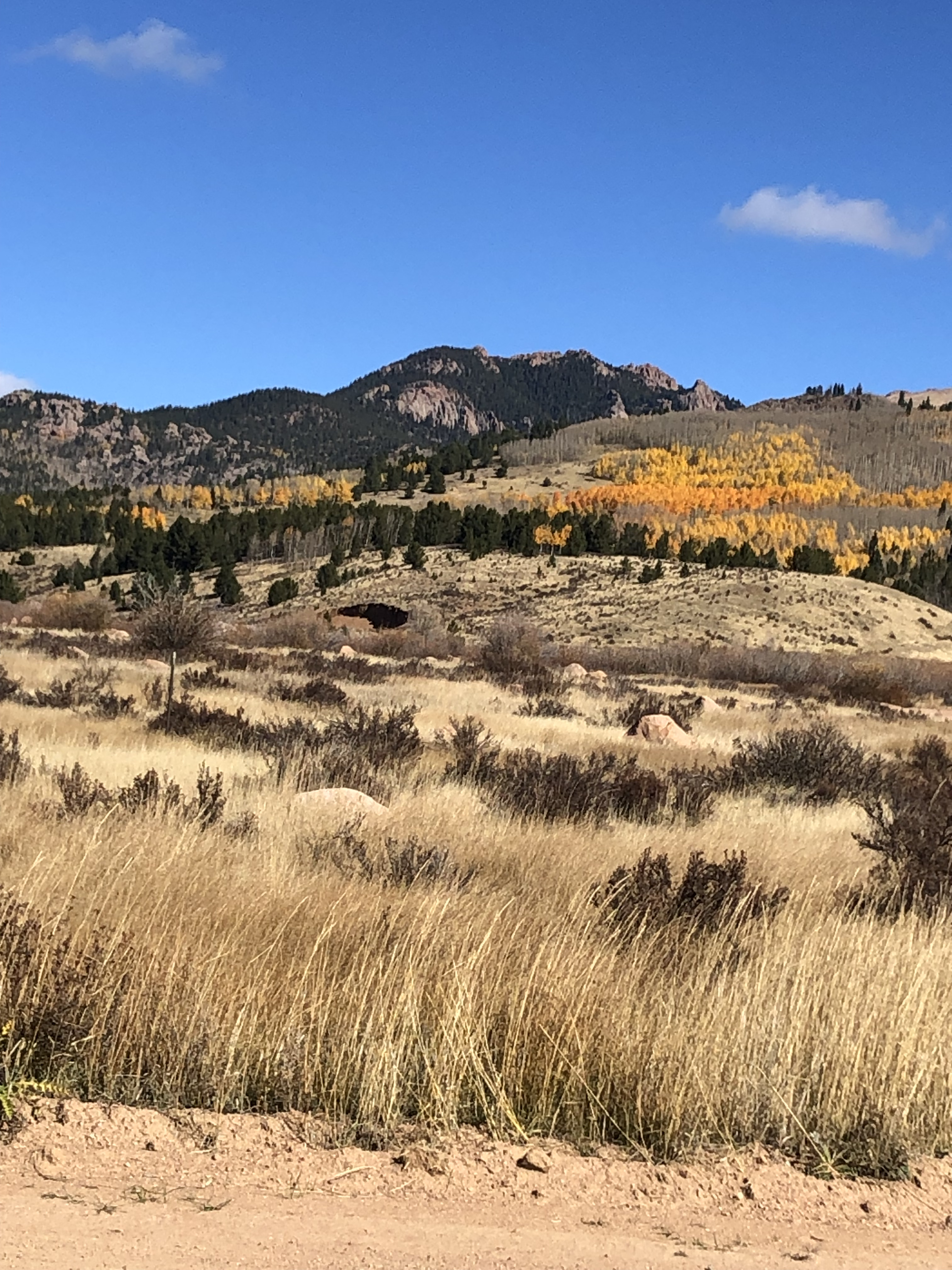
View from 3rd Street and Parker Avenue

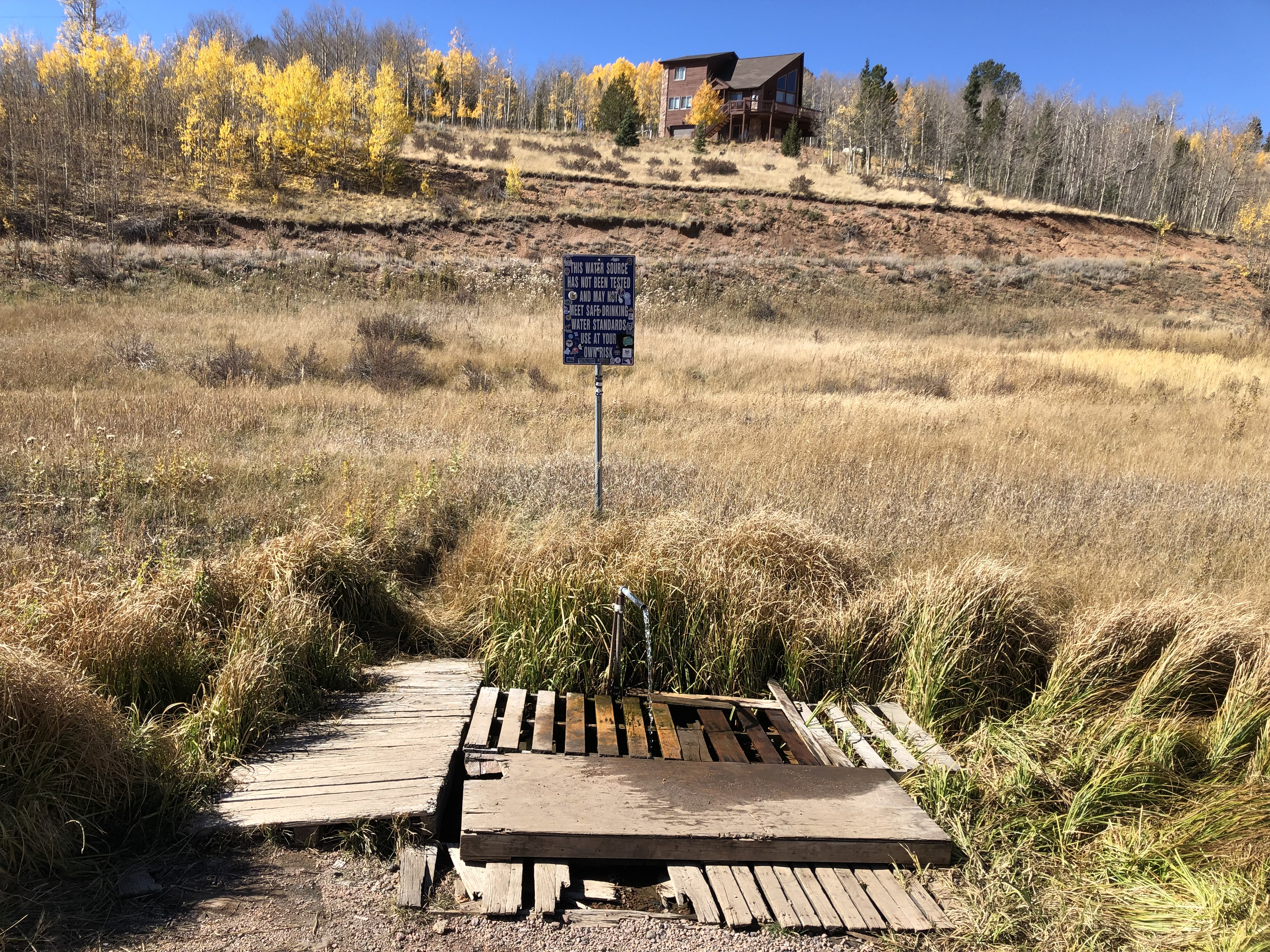
Gillette Flats spring on Highway 67 near a mile marker

The site of Gillett rests in a valley beside a highway near Cripple Creek in Teller County, Colorado, United States. Very little of the town remains.

A nearby artesian spring at Gillette Flats (often used as a public water stop) drew statewide attention in the late 2010s after state water officials moved to shut the diversion down; the closure was postponed while landowners and residents pursued compliance measures. In 2020, a Colorado School of Mines student design project installed a low-cost self-closing faucet and flow meter intended to reduce waste and support continued public access under a water-rights compliance framework.

== See also ==
- List of ghost towns in Colorado
