= Cripple Creek and Victor Narrow Gauge Railroad =

Narrow-gauge railway in Colorado

Coordinates: 38.7478°N 105.1722°W

Cripple Creek & Victor Narrow Gauge Railroad
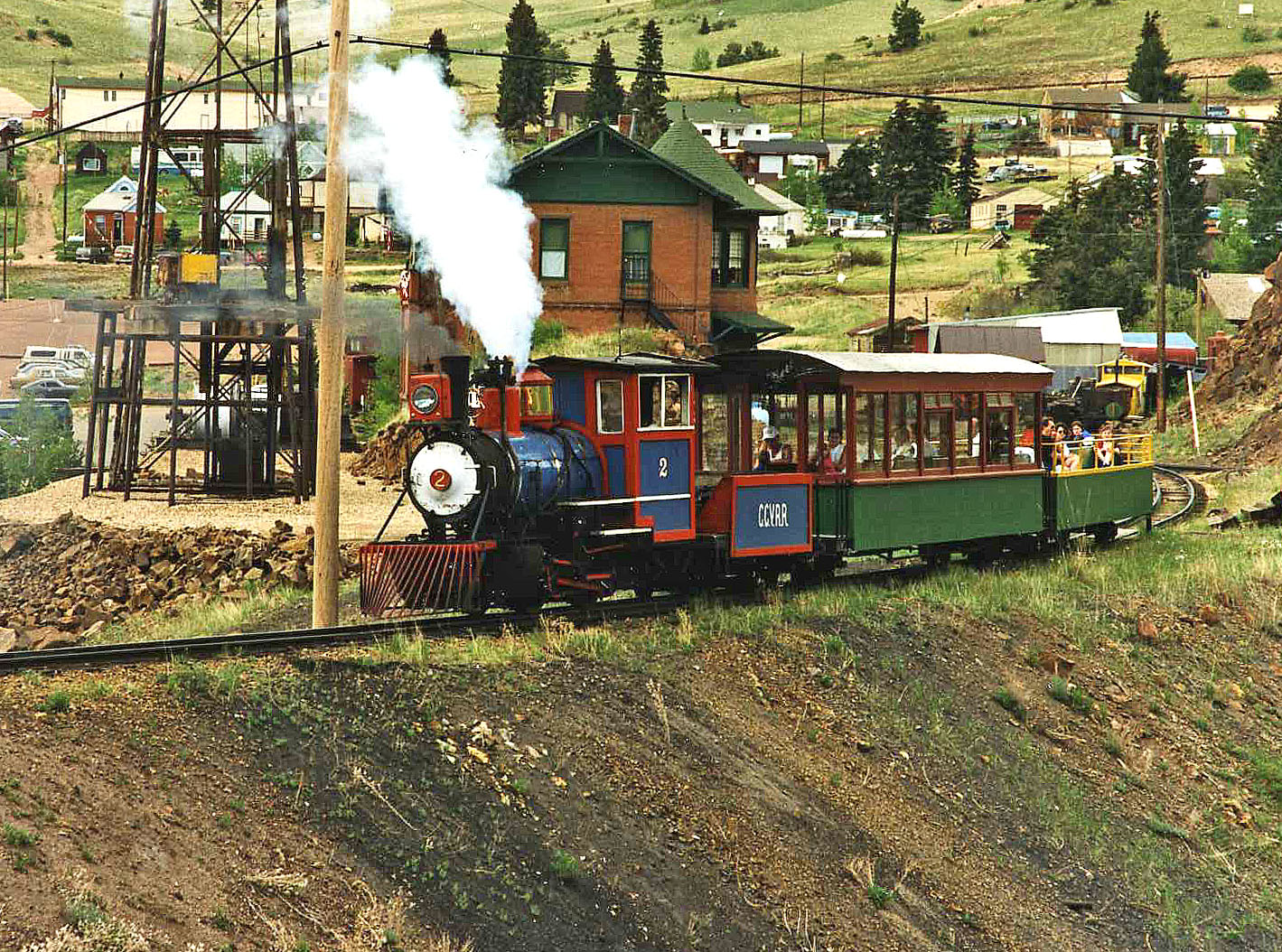
- Engine #2, a 0-4-0 Henschel built in 1936, Cripple Creek & Victor N.G.R.R.
- Locale: Teller County, Colorado

Commercial operations
- Built by: Midland Terminal Railway (MTR); Florence and Cripple Creek Railroad (FCCR)
- Original gauge: 4 ft 8 1/2 in (1,435 mm) standard gauge (MTR), 3 ft (914 mm) (FCCR)

Preserved operations
- Operated by: Cripple Creek & Victor; Narrow Gauge Railroad
- Reporting mark: None
- Length: 4 miles (6.4 km) round trip
- Preserved gauge: 2 ft (610 mm)

Commercial history
- Opened: 1893 (MTR); 1893 (FCCR)
- Closed to passengers: 1931 (MTR), 1915 (FCCR)
- Closed: 1949 (MTR), (1915 FCCR)

Preservation history
- 1967: Start
- present: In operation
- Headquarters: Cripple Creek; Bus.(719) 689-2640; Seasonal operations.

The Cripple Creek & Victor Narrow Gauge Railroad (CC&VNG RR) is a 2 ft (610 mm) narrow-gauge heritage railroad that operates seasonal tourist trains between Cripple Creek and the city's outskirts to the south. The railroad uses a revitalized section of the original Midland Terminal Railway and the Florence and Cripple Creek Railroad. The railroad's one station and around half of its route is located within the Cripple Creek Historic District, a National Historic Landmark.

== Rolling stock ==
As of the 2017 season, the railroad operates three coal-fired narrow-gauge steam locomotives. Engine #1 is an 0-4-4-0 Orenstein & Koppel Mallet locomotive built in 1902. Engine #2 is a 0-4-0 Henschel built in 1936. Engine #3 is an 0-4-0PT H. K. Porter tank built in 1927. Engine #4 is a W. G. Bagnall 0-4-4-0T, built in 1947 which is under long term overhaul. The 5th engine is a 1951 General Electric, 4wDE engine that was battery operated for underground mining at the Idarado Mine near Telluride, Colorado. The engine is currently being used by the railroad's track crew.

Former Lisbon streetcars 762 and 776, in 900 mm (2 ft 11 7/16 in) track gauge, were acquired in 2003 for local operation but remained both mothballed — respectively in a private driveway north of Cripple Creek and in a lot in downtown Victor.

== Rail gauges ==
Although the railroads that previously occupied the Cripple Creek & Victor's route were laid to 4 ft 8 1/2 in (1,435 mm) standard gauge and 3 ft (914 mm) narrow gauge, the current railroad is laid to a 2 ft (610 mm) narrow gauge. The current railroad started operations on June 28, 1967.

== Track route ==
The track system begins at Bennett Avenue/5th Street going south out of Cripple Creek, goes past the old Midland Terminal Wye, then over a reconstructed train trestle, continues past historic mines and terminates very near the abandoned Anaconda mining camp. The return trip to Cripple Creek completes a total of 4 miles (6.4 km). The railroad does not actually terminate at Victor, Colorado, as the railroad's name implies.

== Stations and depot ==
The Bull Hill Station, in Cripple Creek was originally built at the Anaconda Mine in 1894 by the Midland Terminal Railway. However, it was moved to Bull Hill in 1912, east of the town of Victor. In 1968, the depot was moved to Cripple Creek.

== See also ==
- List of Colorado historic railroads
- List of heritage railroads in the United States
