= Midland Terminal Railroad Roundhouse =

- U.S. National Register of Historic Places
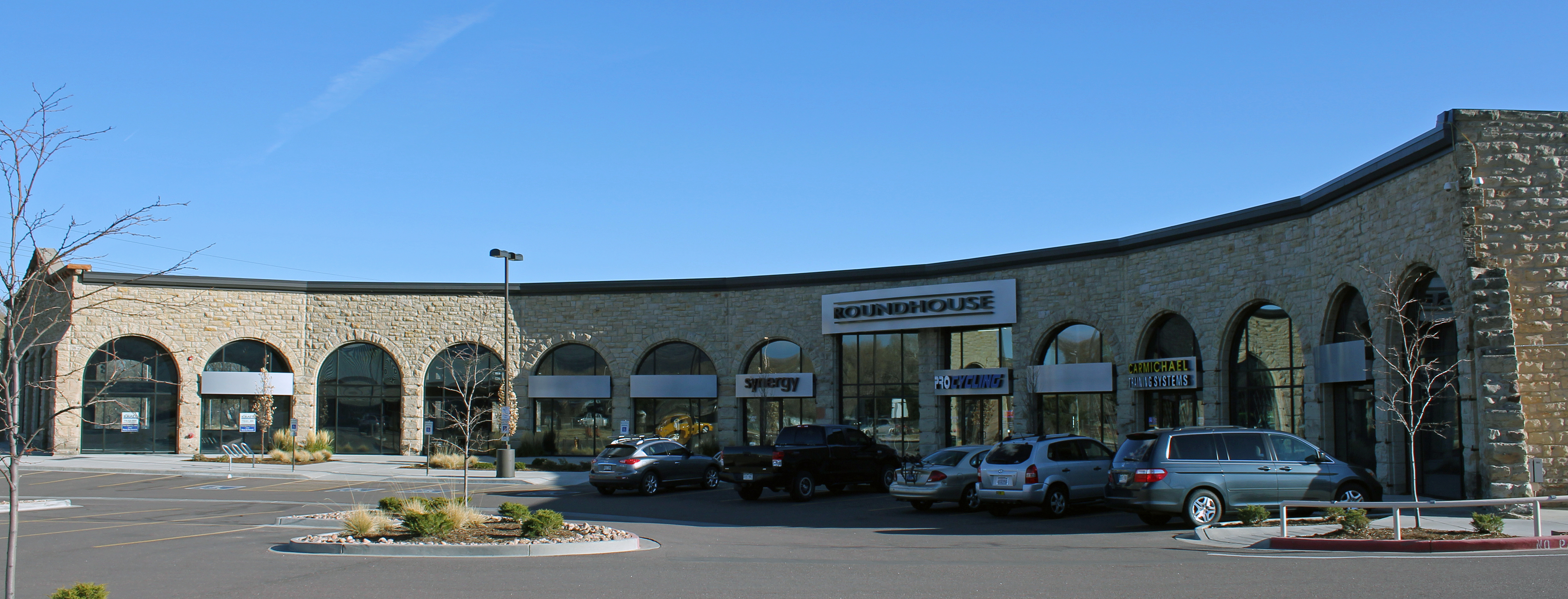
- The roundhouse after its 2008-09 renovation as a commercial strip mall.

- Location within Colorado Location within the United States
- Location: 600 S. 21st St., Colorado Springs, Colorado
- Coordinates: 38°50′24″N 104°51′32″W
- Area: 3.4 acres (1.4 ha)
- Built: 1889
- NRHP reference No.: 79000600
- Added to NRHP: July 10, 1979

The Midland Terminal Railroad Roundhouse is a historic 14 stall railroad roundhouse in Colorado Springs, Colorado, located on US Highway 24 at 21st street. It is between Manitou Springs and the central business district of Colorado Springs. The building was constructed and operated by the Colorado Midland Railroad which was founded in 1883 but the roundhouse dates from 1887 to 1888. It was located in Colorado City until 1917, when Colorado City became part of Colorado Springs. Due to the World War I Railroad War Board rerouting of Colorado Midland traffic to the Denver and Rio Grande Western, the CM shutdown in 1917 and went into bankruptcy in 1918. The roundhouse was then owned and operated by the Midland Terminal Railway which purchased the Colorado Midland portion from Colorado Springs to Divide, Colorado in 1921. The MT shut down in 1949.

Van Briggle Pottery purchased the roundhouse in 1955 and renovated the building with interior partitions, office space and pottery plant. They called it their Midland Plant. Van Briggle prospered at the location for over 50 years until they moved to a new location in November 2008. The size of the roundhouse had become a burden on the business and the owners wanted to downsize. They reopened at 1024 S. Tejon Street in May 2009

The roundhouse was placed on the National Register of Historic Places in 1979.

The roundhouse was sold to local developer Griffis/Blessing who gutted the building to its original stone walls and wood timber frame and renovated the building at a cost of $2.5 million into an upscale retail center. The renovation included glass windows framed by the original track door openings. In May 2009 Carmichael Training Systems, the coach for Lance Armstrong, moved into the renovated roundhouse. Included in their facility is Endurance Sports Club, a training facility. They occupy about 10,500 square feet of the 38,000-square-foot building.

In February 2012 construction began for Colorado Mountain Brewery to open their second location in the roundhouse.

== See also ==
- Colorado Midland Railway
- Midland Terminal Railway
- National Register of Historic Places listings in El Paso County, Colorado
- Van Briggle Pottery
