= Pikes Peak Library District =

Library system in Colorado Springs, Colorado, United States

- 38.8353°N 104.8260°W
- Location: 20 N Cascade Ave., Colorado Springs, Colorado, United States, United States
- Type: Public Library
- Established: 1964; 62 years ago
- Service area: El Paso County, Colorado
- Branches: 14

Collection
- Size: 1.1 million items

Access and use
- Circulation: 8.5 million
- Population served: 669,874

Other information
- Employees: 381
- Website: ppld.org

Pikes Peak Library District (PPLD) is an American public library system in Colorado Springs, Colorado, United States. It serves a population of more than 650,000 across 2,070 square miles in El Paso County, Colorado.

== History ==
The first public library in the area was opened by the Colorado Springs Social Union in downtown Colorado Springs in October 1885. The Colorado Springs Free Reading Room and Public Library began as a subscription library and housed about 8,000 volumes by 1903. In 1903, the Free Public Library of Colorado Springs was established to hold its growing collection. In 1905, the city of Colorado Springs opened a new free public library with the support of $60,000 in Carnegie funds and property donated by the city's founder, General William J. Palmer.

In 1904, a new branch opened in Colorado City. In 1954, the library began providing its bookmobile service. In March 1955, the Friends of the Pikes Peak Library District formed to advocate for the library, operate bookstores in the libraries, and host events. In 1962, a regional library district was approved, prompting the building of additional branch locations throughout the county in subsequent years.

In 1996, the historic 1905 Carnegie library was added to the National Register of Historic Places. The Carnegie library received a grant for renovation and preservation purposes in 1997; renovations were completed in 2002. In 2004, District circulations exceeded six million items. In 2006, PPLD started eBranch (now called the eLibrary), enabling patrons to download eBooks and audio materials to their electronic devices. In June 2014, Library 21c opened, "the first of its kind in the country, with makerspaces, a video and recording studio, business and entrepreneurial center, cafe, and performance venue in addition to traditional library materials such as books and movies."

On April 4, 2023, Teona Krebs was appointed as the chief librarian and CEO of the Pikes Peak Library district. She was also the first immigrant to lead the library district.

In November 2024, Manitou Springs Library began its move back to its historic Carnegie Library building following completion of ADA accessibility updates. The library collocated with the Manitou Arts Center from 2021 - 2024. In November 2024, the PPLD Board of Trustees voted not to renew the lease on Rockrimmon Library.

Also in 2024, Old Colorado City Library celebrated its 120th anniversary of serving patrons on the West Side. The library is housed in its original 1904 Carnegie Library building, which has had restorative updates over the years to preserve the building for future generations.

== Annual programs ==
- Winter Adult Reading Program
- All Pikes Peak Makes
- All Pikes Peak Reads (APPR)
- Mountain of Authors
- Pikes Peak Regional History Symposium
- Pikes Peak Poetry Summit
- Library Lawn Concert Series (at Manitou Springs Library and Palmer Lake Library)
- Teen Art Contest
- Summer Adventure
- Jean Ciavonne Poetry Contest (for 4th and 5th graders)
- Kindergarten Round-Up Resource Fair
- Homeschool Resource Fair
- Homeschool Science Fair
- Homeschool Book Blast

== Locations ==
The Pikes Peak Library District provides services at 14 physical locations and through its mobile library.

Pikes Peak Library District
Locations	Address
Calhan Library	600 Bank Street, Calhan, CO 80808
Cheyenne Mountain Library	1785 South 8th Street, Suite 100, Colorado Springs, CO 80905
East Library	5550 N. Union Blvd., Colorado Springs, CO 80918
Fountain Library	230 South Main St., Fountain, CO 80817
High Prairie Library	7035 Old Meridian Rd., Peyton, CO 80831
Library 21c	1175 Chapel Hills Dr., Colorado Springs, CO 80920
Manitou Springs Library	701 Manitou Ave., Manitou Springs, CO 80829
Monument Library	1706 Lake Woodmoor Dr., Monument, CO 80132
Old Colorado City Library	2418 West Pikes Peak Ave, Colorado Springs, CO 80904
Palmer Lake Library	66 Lower Glenway, Palmer Lake, CO 80133
Penrose Library	20 N. Cascade Ave, Colorado Springs, CO 80903
Ruth Holley Library	685 North Murray Blvd., Colorado Springs, CO 80915
Sand Creek Library	1821 South Academy Blvd., Colorado Springs, CO 80916
Ute Pass Library	8010 Severy Rd., Cascade, CO 80809
