= Florence and Cripple Creek Railroad =

Railroad in Colorado (1893–1915)

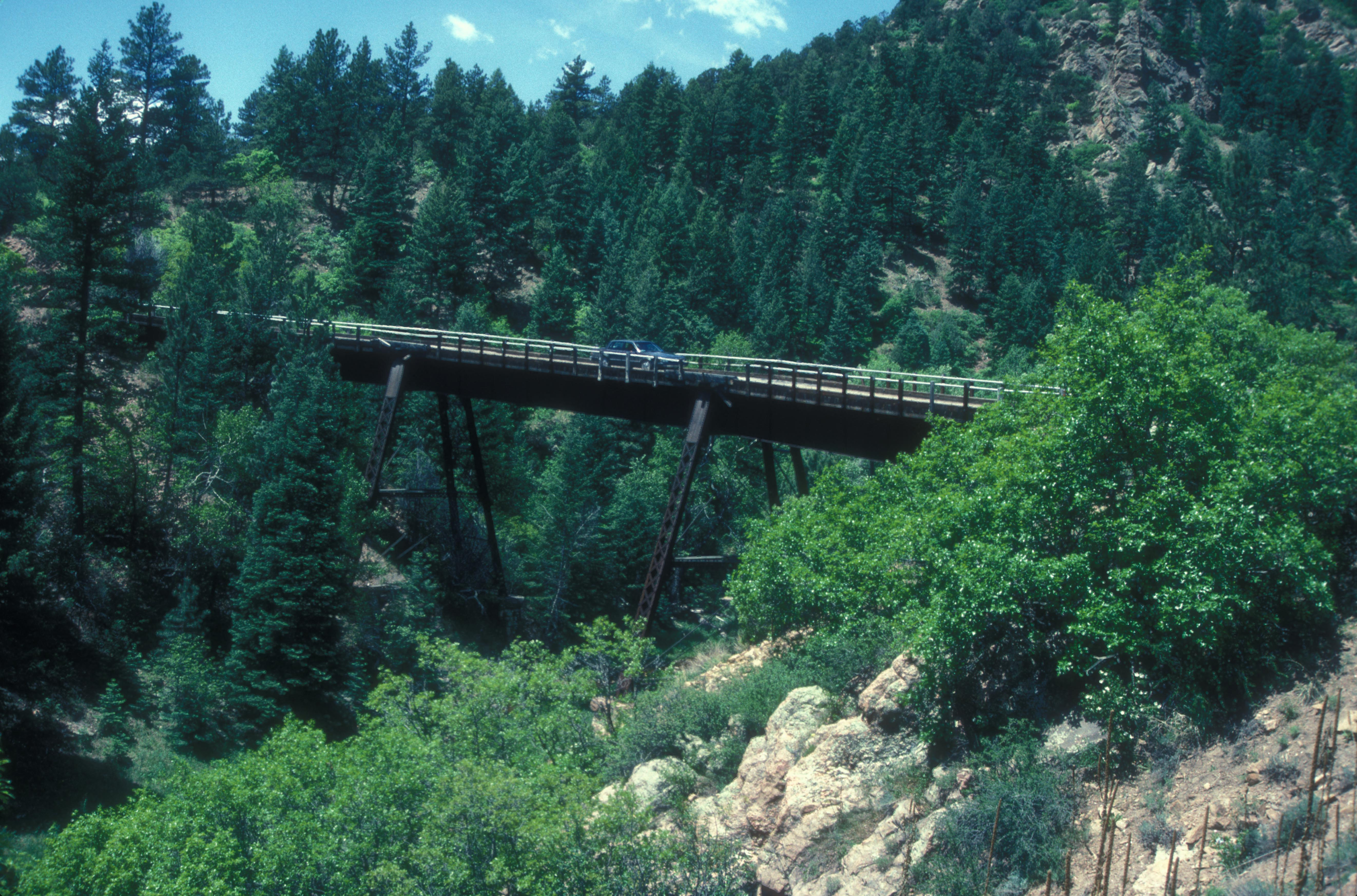
- Florence and Cripple Creek Railroad Adelaide, Fremont County, Colorado bridge in Phantom Canyon

Overview
- Locale: Colorado
- Dates of operation: 1893–1915

Technical
- Track gauge: 3 ft (914 mm)

The Florence and Cripple Creek Railroad (F&CC) was a 3 ft (914 mm) narrow-gauge railroad running northward from junctions with the Denver & Rio Grande Railroad at the mill towns of Florence and later moved to Cañon City, Colorado, on the banks of the Arkansas River, up steep and narrow Phantom Canyon to the Cripple Creek Mining District, west of Pikes Peak. It was founded in 1893 and went out of business in 1915.

== History ==
Started in 1893, it was the first railroad to reach the new, booming mining district from the "outside world" and as a result it earned substantial profits in its first years. The railroad hauled people and goods into the mining district, and ore concentrates from the mines south for milling in either Florence, through a branch line to Canon City, or transfer to the D&RG for milling in Pueblo, Colorado. The F&CC's first main terminal was located in Victor, the "second city" of the district but its branch lines served many of the largest mines within the area.

Ultimately, the F&CC began to struggle financially as other competing railroads, built to the 4 ft 8 1/2 in (1,435 mm) standard gauge, Midland Terminal and Colorado Springs & Cripple Creek District Railroads entered the district from Colorado Springs from the north or east. In addition, flash floods washed out significant sections of the F&CC mainline in the narrows of Phantom Canyon several times. By the early 1900s, the railroad was in serious financial trouble and merged with other railroads of the area under the Cripple Creek Central holding company. A final, large flash flood destroyed enough of the F&CC's right-of-way to convince its new owners it was financially unwise to spend money rebuilding it; and the line was abandoned and scrapped.

In 1912, the Adelaide Phantom Canyon bridge–named for the nearby settlement of Adelaide–was abandoned. The railroad went out of business in 1915. The F&CC's well-kept motive power, twelve 2-8-0 Consolidation freight engines, six 4-6-0 Ten-Wheelers passenger engines, and one 2-4-4T engine to power commuter trains were quickly sold to other area 3 ft (914 mm) gauge railroads. An F&CC subsidiary, the Golden Circle Railroad, which operated 3 ft (914 mm) commuter routes within the district itself, continued to operate for several more years after its parent's abandonment.

Today Phantom Canyon Road, which incorporates much of the original grade for this route but has fewer crossings of the creek, is part of the Gold Belt Byway and is open to traffic for most of the summer months. The Canon City branch roughly follows County Road 123 from the Phantom Canyon Road to US 50 near Canon City. The graded gravel Phantom Canyon road is suitable for regular cars and has a unique bent bridge.

Various pieces of Florence & Cripple Creek rolling stock still exist. F&CC engines (that were later owned by other railroads) are at the Colorado Railroad Museum, Nevada State Railroad Museum Boulder City, and the Cumbres and Toltec Scenic Railroad. F&CC coach #57 and a boxcar are preserved at the Nevada County Narrow Gauge Railroad & Transportation Museum.

== Locomotives ==
Number	Type	Builder	SN	Built	Disposition	Notes
1	2-8-0	Baldwin Locomotive Works	14185	12/1894	Unknown.	
2	2-8-0	Baldwin Locomotive Works	14186	12/1894	Unknown.	
3	2-8-0	Baldwin Locomotive Works	14352	7/1895	Sold in 1917 to Denver & Rio Grande #425.	Renumbered to D&RGW #315 in 1924. Currently in operational condition at the Cumbres & Toltec Scenic Railroad in Chama, New Mexico.
4	2-8-0	Baldwin Locomotive Works	14353	7/1895	Sold in 1918 to Montana Southern #1.	Scrapped 1935.
5	2-8-0	Baldwin Locomotive Works	14513	10/1895	Sold in 1917 to Denver & Rio Grande #427.	Renumbered to D&RGW #317 in 1924. Scrapped 1948.
6	2-8-0	Baldwin Locomotive Works	14514	10/1895	Unknown.	
7	2-8-0	Baldwin Locomotive Works	14768	3/1896	Sold to Cripple Creek & Colorado Springs Railroad #35.	Sold in 1920 to Denver & Rio Grande #424. Renumbered D&RGW #320 in 1924. Scrap 1938.
8	2-8-0	Baldwin Locomotive Works	14769	3/1896	Sold in 1917 to Denver & Rio Grande #428.	Renumbered to D&RGW #318 in 1924. Currently on display at the Colorado Railroad Museum in Golden. Colorado.
9	2-8-0	Baldwin Locomotive Works	14770	3/1896	Sold in 1917 to Denver & Rio Grande #429.	Renumbered to D&RGW #319 in 1924. Intentionally destroyed in 1951 for the movie Denver and Rio Grande.
10	2-8-0	Baldwin Locomotive Works	14771	3/1896	Sold in 1917 to the Uintah Railway #12.	Sold in 1937 to the Eureka-Nevada #12. Currently on display at the Nevada Southern Railway Museum.
11	2-8-0	Baldwin Locomotive Works	15246	3/1897	Sold in 1917 to Denver & Rio Grande #426.	Renumbered to D&RGW #316 in 1924. Scrapped 1946.
12	2-8-0	Baldwin Locomotive Works	15247	3/1897	Sold in 1920 to Montana Southern #2.	Scrapped 1935.
20	4-6-0	Schenectady Locomotive Works	5007	4/1899	Sold in 1916 to the Rio Grande Southern #20.	Currently operational at the Colorado Railroad Museum in Golden, Colorado.
21	4-6-0	Schenectady Locomotive Works	5008	4/1899	Sold in 1916 to Rio Grande Southern #25.	Renumbered #25 in 1905. Scrapped 1940.
22	4-6-0	Schenectady Locomotive Works	5399	1/1900	Sold to Nevada-California-Oregon #22 in 1915.	Moved to the Carson & Colorado as Southern Pacific #22 in 1928. Scrapped 1949.
23	4-6-0	Schenectady Locomotive Works	5420	1/1900	Sold to Nevada-California-Oregon #23 in 1915.	Moved to the Carson & Colorado as Southern Pacific #23 in 1928. Not used by SP. Scrapped 1946.
24	4-6-0	Schenectady Locomotive Works	5421	1/1900	Sold in 1916 to Rio Grande Southern #22.	Scrapped 1946.
51	2-4-4T	Schenectady Locomotive Works	4740	5/1898	Sold in 1914 to Pajaro Valley Consolidated Railway #10.	Built as Golden Circle Railway #51. Sold to F&CC #51 in 1900. Scrapped 1935.
52	4-6-0	Schenectady Locomotive Works	5006	4/1899	Sold in 1920 to Kentwood, Greensburg & Southwestern Railroad.	Built as Golden Circle Railway #52. Sold to F&CC #52 in 1900. Presumed scrapped.

== See also ==
- Cripple Creek & Victor Narrow Gauge Railroad
