= Old Colorado City =

- Colorado Springs neighborhood
- Colorado City, Colorado Territory
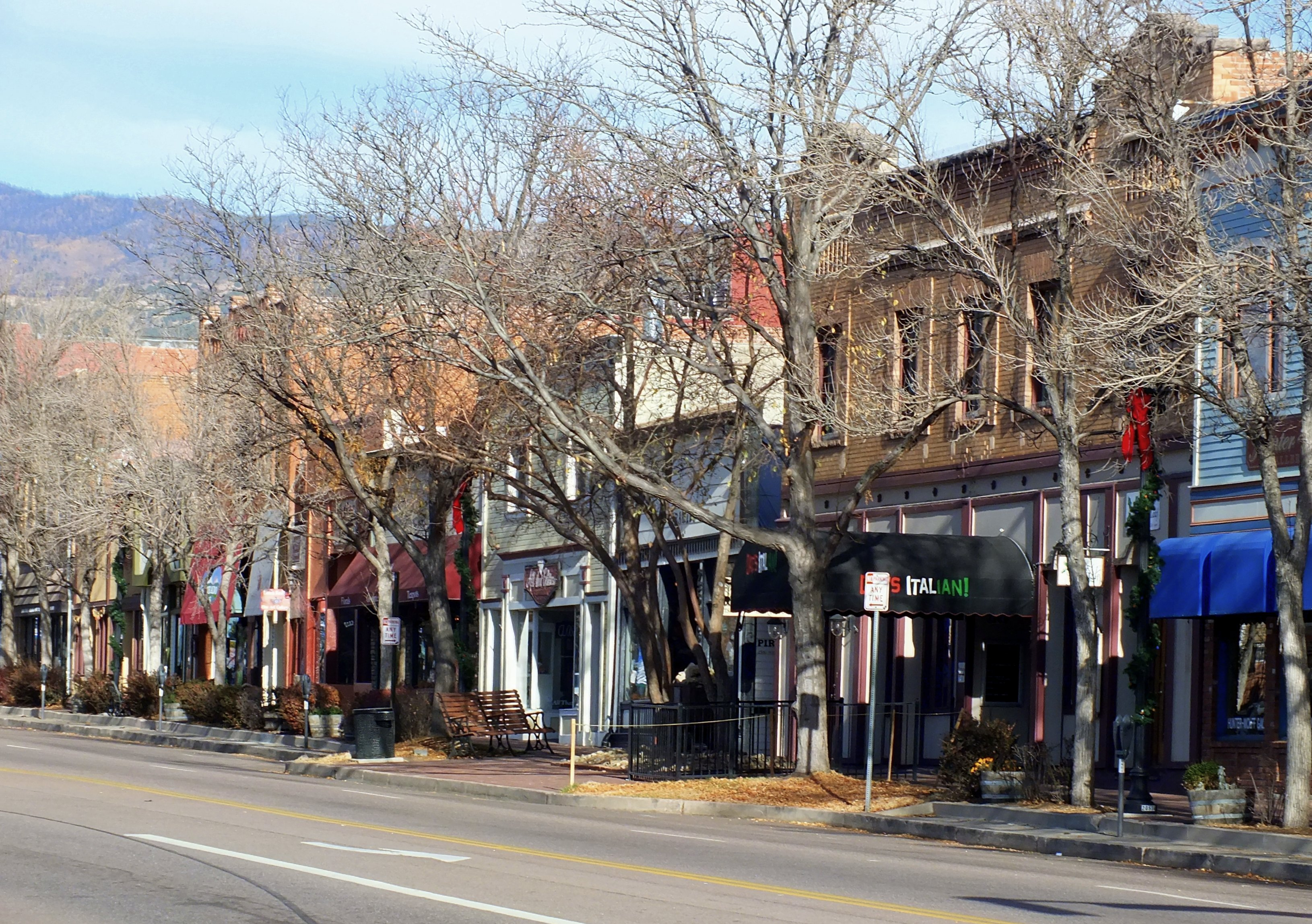
- Old Colorado City Business District
- Interactive map of Old Colorado City
- Coordinates: 38.8467°N 104.8619°W
- Country: United States
- State: Colorado
- County: El Paso
- City: Colorado Springs
- Incorporated (town): August 11, 1859
- Time zone: UTC-7 (MST)
  - Summer (DST): UTC-6 (MDT)
- Old Colorado City Historic Commercial District
- U.S. National Register of Historic Places
- U.S. Historic district
- Location within the United States Location within Colorado
- Location: N side of Colorado Ave. from 24th St., W to 2611 Colorado Ave., also includes 115 S. 26 St. and 2418 W. Pikes Peak Ave., Colorado Springs, Colorado
- Area: 8 acres (3.2 ha)
- Architect: Multiple
- Architectural style: Western Victorian
- NRHP reference No.: 82001018
- Added to NRHP: November 2, 1982

Old Colorado City, formerly Colorado City, is a former town and a neighborhood within the city of Colorado Springs, Colorado. Its commercial district was listed on the National Register of Historic Places in 1982. It was founded during the Pikes Peak Gold Rush of 1859 and was involved in the mining industry, both as a supply hub and as a gold ore processing center beginning in the 1890s. Residents of Colorado City worked at some of the 50 coal mines of the Colorado Springs area. It was briefly the capital of the Colorado Territory. For many years, Colorado Springs prohibited the use of alcohol within its border due to the lifestyle of Colorado City's opium dens, bordellos, and saloons. It is now a tourist area, with boutiques, art galleries, and restaurants.

== Etymology ==
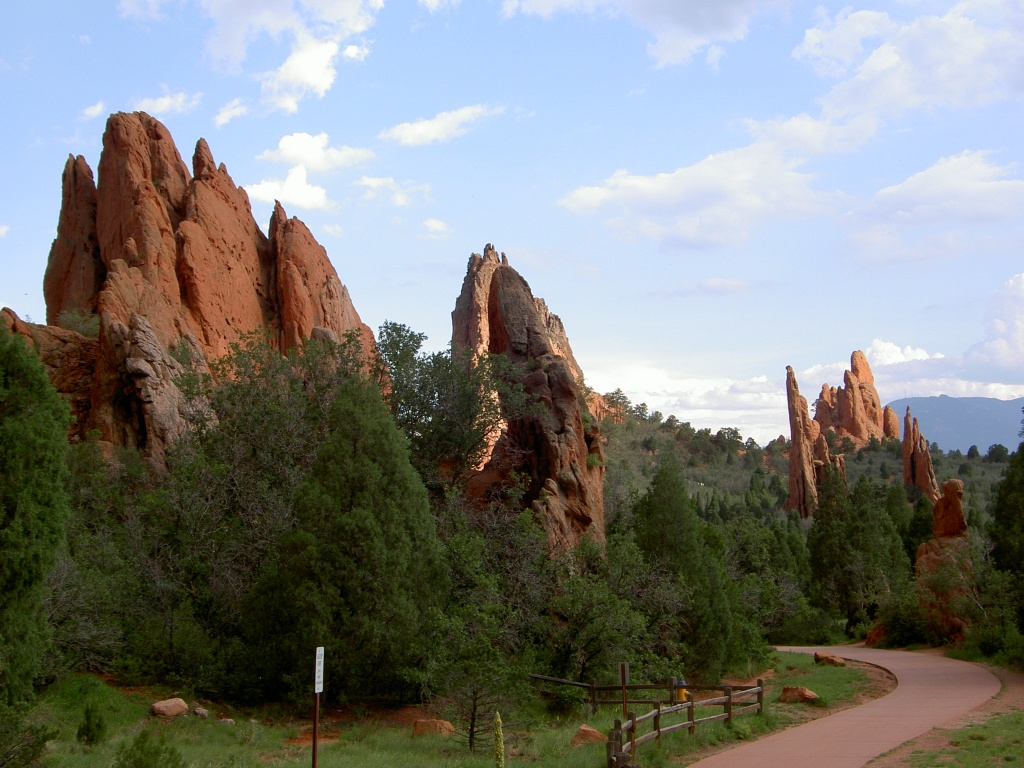
Garden of the Gods formations

It was first known, and only briefly, as El Dorado, named for the gold mines found during the gold rush. The name Colorado City was selected by its founders because of the red sandstone rocks and red outcroppings in the vicinity (specifically, the Rampart Range and Garden of the Gods formations). The word Colorado in Spanish means "blushing" or "red".

== Geography ==
The approximate boundaries are U.S. Highway 24 to the south, 32nd Street to the west, 13th Street to the east and Uintah Street to the north, with the town square restructured as Bancroft Park.

== History ==
=== Founded ===
Colorado City Town Company laid claim to two square miles of land that would become Colorado City on May 22, 1859. Founded at the confluence of Fountain and Camp creeks on August 13, 1859, it was the first Pikes Peak region settlement. The founders— Melancthon Beach, Anthony Bott, George Bute, and Rufus Cable—envisioned Colorado City as a major supply hub for the new gold mines in South Park and the Blue River, where major strikes in the Pike's Peak Gold Rush had recently been made. The location for the town was selected for its proximity to Ute Pass, the route westward to the gold mines.

In 1859, Colorado City was in the most westerly part of Kansas Territory. The Colorado City area became part of the Jefferson Territory on October 24, 1859. There were more than 300 cabins that had been built by 1861. Its residents included ranchers, farmers, freighters, and outfitters for gold prospectors.

=== Territorial capital and county seat ===
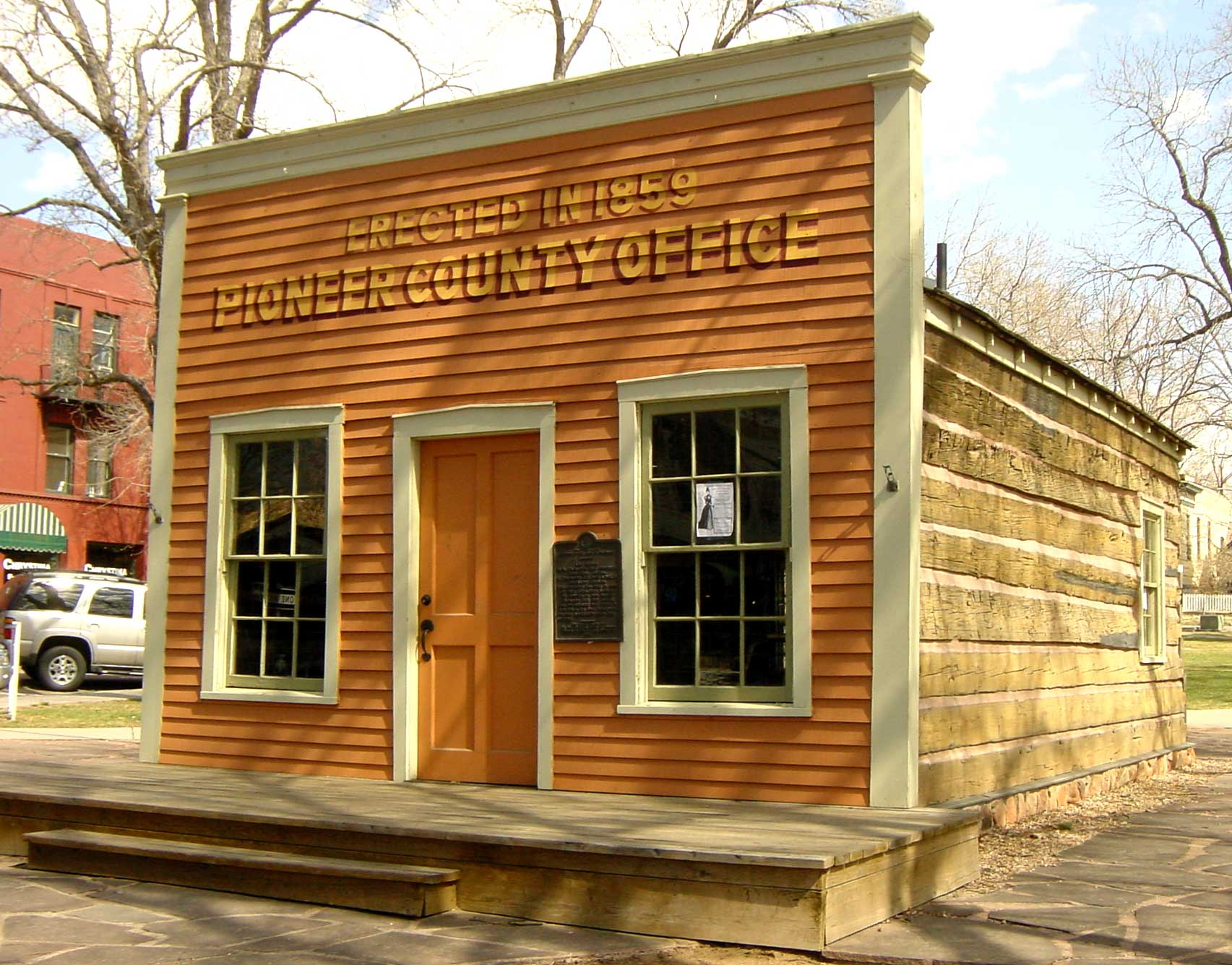
Former El Paso County courthouse, Old Colorado City

Colorado Territory was established on November 5, 1861. Until August 14, 1862 (including one legislative session), the city was the Colorado Territory capital until it was moved to Golden. Colorado City effectively functioned as the capital for only five days. When the second territorial legislature met at Colorado City on July 7, 1862, in a log cabin that still stands on Colorado Avenue, they found the accommodations so inadequate that they voted to adjourn on July 11 and reconvene in Denver on July 16.

El Paso County was formed in 1861 and Colorado City was the county seat until 1873, when the courthouse moved to Colorado Springs.

=== Saloons and bordellos ===
For the first two decades, the population of the town decreased. Some people chose to farm or ranch outside of the town limits. In addition, the town did not get the travelers it anticipated because most people chose to travel through Denver due to skirmishes with Native Americans along the Arkansas River. Its primary interest was as a "watering hole", due to its many saloons on the south side of Colorado Avenue. There were brothels and gambling rooms on upper floors of the saloons and brothels behind the saloons on Cucharras Street. Tunnels under Colorado Avenue ensured that men could enter these businesses without being seen. In addition to saloons and brothels, Colorado City had opium dens in its early days. When William Jackson Palmer purchased the land for Colorado Springs, he outlawed the consumption of alcohol within the new town's borders in reaction to the businesses he found unsavory in Colorado City. In 1896 and until 1916, ordinances were passed that prohibited prostitution, opium dens, and dance halls, but brothels continued to be established after 1896. The mayor of the town had warned prostitutes to leave Colorado City by 1908 or 1909, when most of the red-light district was burned down in two separate fires. Between 1902 and 1909, there were other fires along Saloon Row and the red light district. Liquor was outlawed in Colorado City in 1916. For the bordellos that rebuilt or remained, they received continued pressure to close down until Colorado City was annexed to Colorado Springs in 1917. At that time, at least one owner, Laura Bell McDaniel, was arrested. In 1933, at the end of Prohibition, Colorado Springs lifted the ban of the sale and consumption of alcohol.

Colorado was a rough town. Saloons were plentiful, and frequent brawls and gun fights broke out. Justice was meted out by a citizens' court.

— Nancy Capace

=== Coal miners ===
Coal was mined in Colorado Springs beginning in 1859. At the industry's height, there were 50 coal mines in the Colorado Springs, mostly in the Rockrimmon and Cragmor - Colorado Springs Country Club area. Mine workers often lived on the west side of town, like Old Colorado City, while investors lived in the Old North End.

=== Transportation ===
==== Historic trails and roads ====
Roads into the area included a toll road that connected to the northeast with the Overland's 1865 "Despatch Express Route". Southward out of Colorado City a stage road (now Old Stage Road) traversed through South Cheyenne Creek's canyon to Cripple Creek, and a carriage road through North and South Cheyenne Canyons and westward was the Ute Pass Wagon Road. Another route into the area was the north–south Cherokee Trail / Jimmy Camp Trail, which was near the Goodnight–Loving Trail. The Jimmy Camp Trail was one branch of the Trapper's Trail, a trail used by trappers and explorers from 1820 and during the gold rush. Trapper's Trail ran north–south from Fort Laramie to the El Pueblo trading post in the present Pueblo County, and from there branched off to Bent's Old Fort or Taos, New Mexico.

==== Railroad spurs growth ====
Historical population
Census	Pop.	Note	%±
1870	81		—
1880	347		328.4%
1890	1,788		415.3%
1900	2,914		63.0%
1910	4,333		48.7%

In 1883, the Colorado Midland Railroad came to Colorado City, with its operating and administrative headquarters in the town.

Industries located in and around town to take advantage of the convenient rail access. The industries that generated thousands of jobs included ore processing mills, Ute Pass Paint Factory, Colorado City Glass Works, and Hassell Iron Works. Banks, restaurants, rooming houses, offices, meeting halls and other supporting commercial establishments were built along the north side of Colorado Avenue between Court and 26th Street. The town's workforce also included railroad workers.

=== Supply hub and processing mills ===
Major gold strikes were made west of Colorado City during the Cripple Creek Gold Rush in the 1890s. The town grew as ore was sent to the town to be processed and prospectors came to purchase supplies and for amusement. Ore processing mills were established in Colorado City in the 1890s. Eventually Colorado City was processing much of the gold ore mined at Cripple Creek. There were four processing companies in Colorado City before 1912. Golden Cycle Mill had a better reduction process and by 1912 the other mills had ceased to operate.

Colorado City was the location of a 1903 strike that spread to Cripple Creek and eventually led to the Colorado Labor Wars. In the 1910s, a reduction in demand for the railroad and ore processing mills depressed Colorado City's economy.

=== Annexation ===
Part of Old Colorado City was annexed in 1898. It was finally incorporated into Colorado Springs in 1917 and called West Colorado Springs, or more popularly, the West Side.

=== Historic district ===
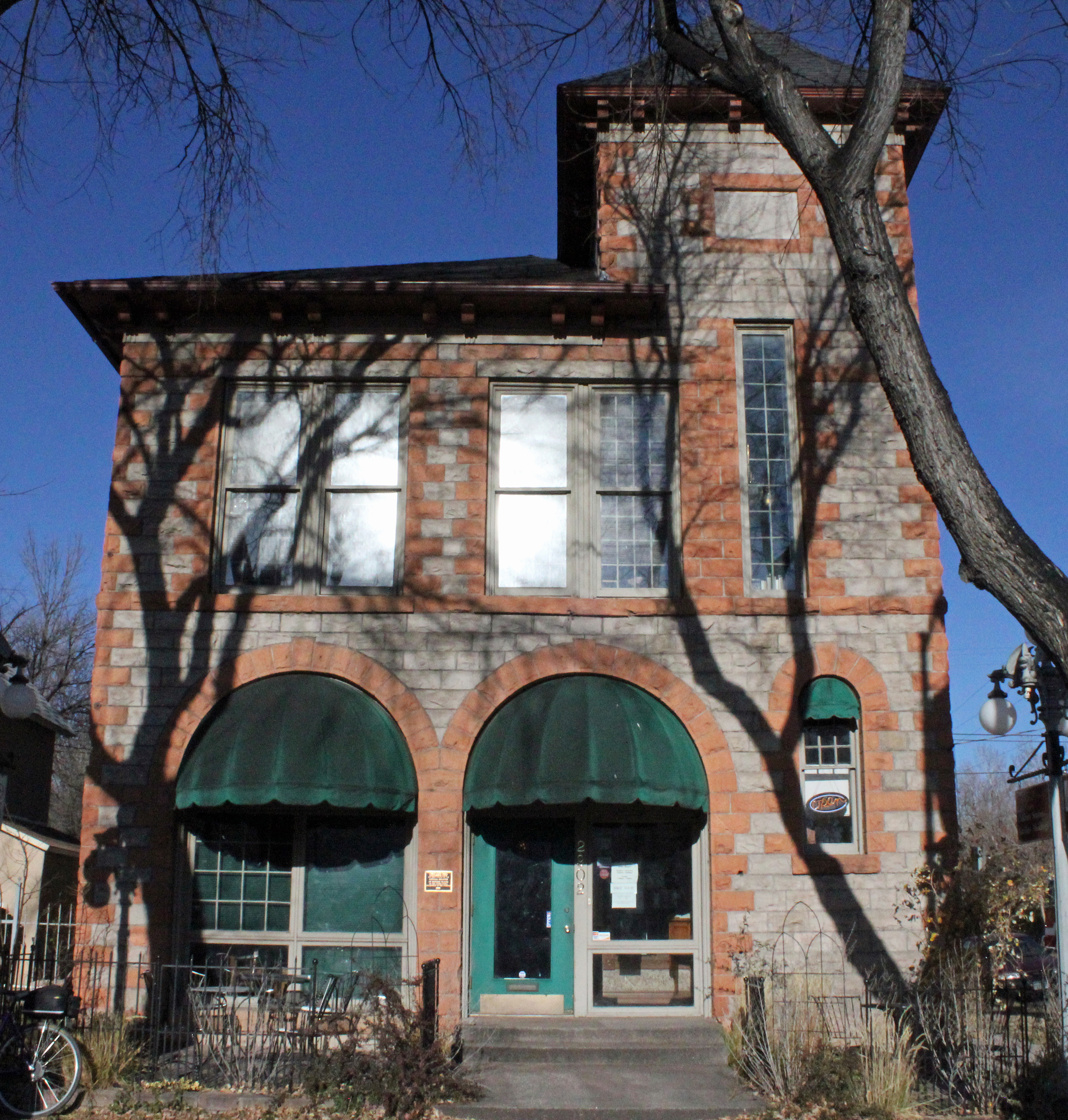
City Hall of Old Colorado City, built in 1892

Since the mid-1970s, Old Colorado City had been part of private and public revitalization efforts, including capturing the historical character of its buildings, burying utility wires, and landscaping. Buildings have been painted colors used around the turn of the 20th century, modern signs have been replaced or removed, and architectural details have been exposed.

In 1982, the Old Colorado Historic Commercial District was listed on the National Register of Historic Places. It includes 27 properties situated primarily along Colorado Avenue between 24th and 26th streets and some additional properties on Court Street and the block between 26th and 27th streets.

One-story frame and brick buildings are the earliest known style of construction. Western Victorian, turn-of-the-century commercial buildings are the second style. These structures are generally two-story, red brick structures with Queen Anne, Romanesque Revival and Italianate style architecture. Bancroft Park is located within the district. It includes a bandshell, pavilion and early pioneer cabin.

=== Modern history ===
Old Colorado City has a shopping district featuring art galleries, boutiques, restaurants, and tourist shops. Special attractions include Simpich Showcase and Magic Town at The Michael Garman Museum and Gallery.

== Notable people ==
- Irving Howbert, one of the founders of Colorado Springs, lived briefly in Old Colorado City prior to 1864.
- Paulina Peavy, an American artist (best known for her painting), inventor, designer, sculptor, poet, writer, and lecturer, was born in Old Colorado City, Colorado on August 24, 1901

== Gallery ==
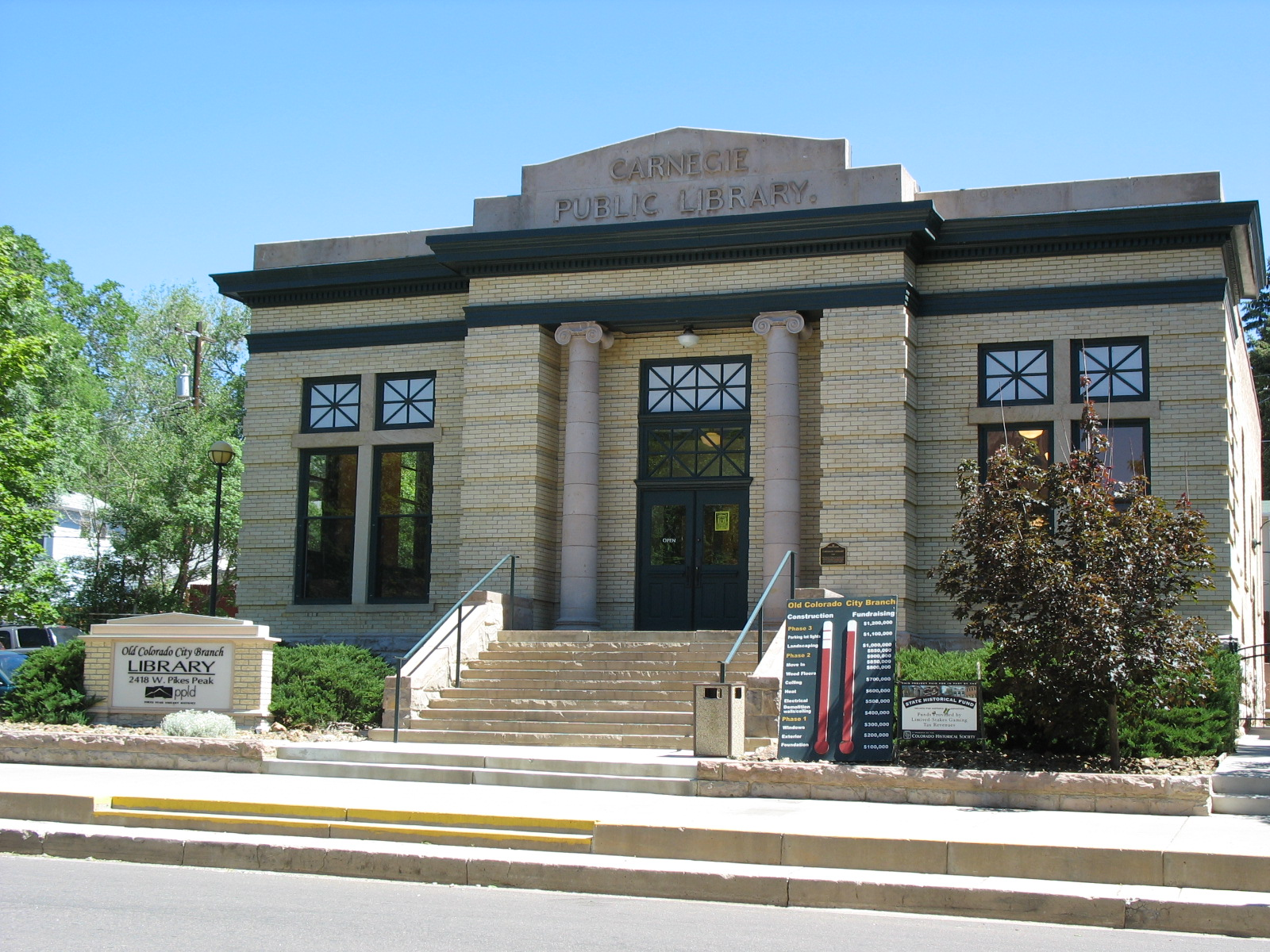
Old Colorado City Branch Carnegie Library

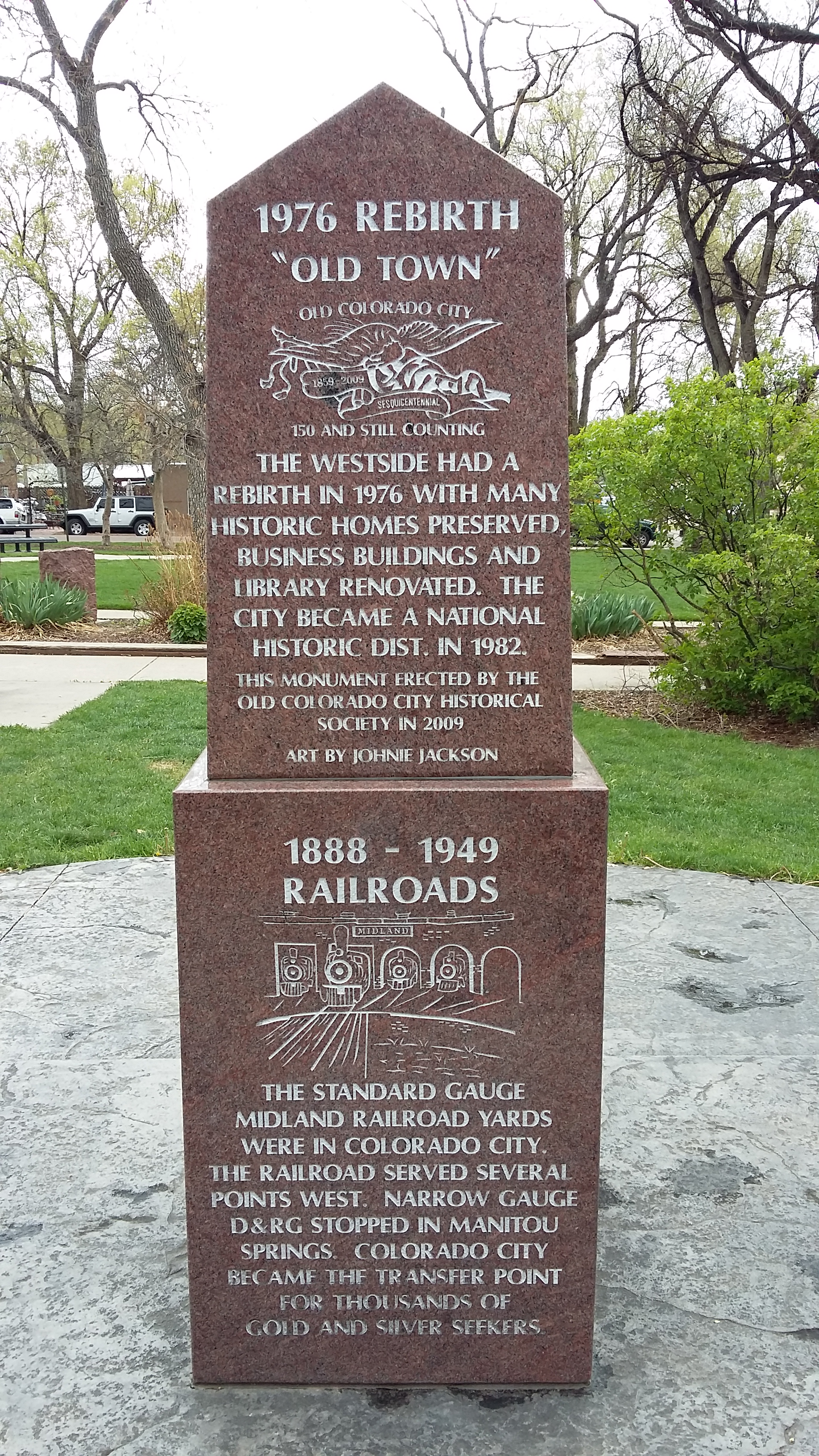
Old Colorado City monument

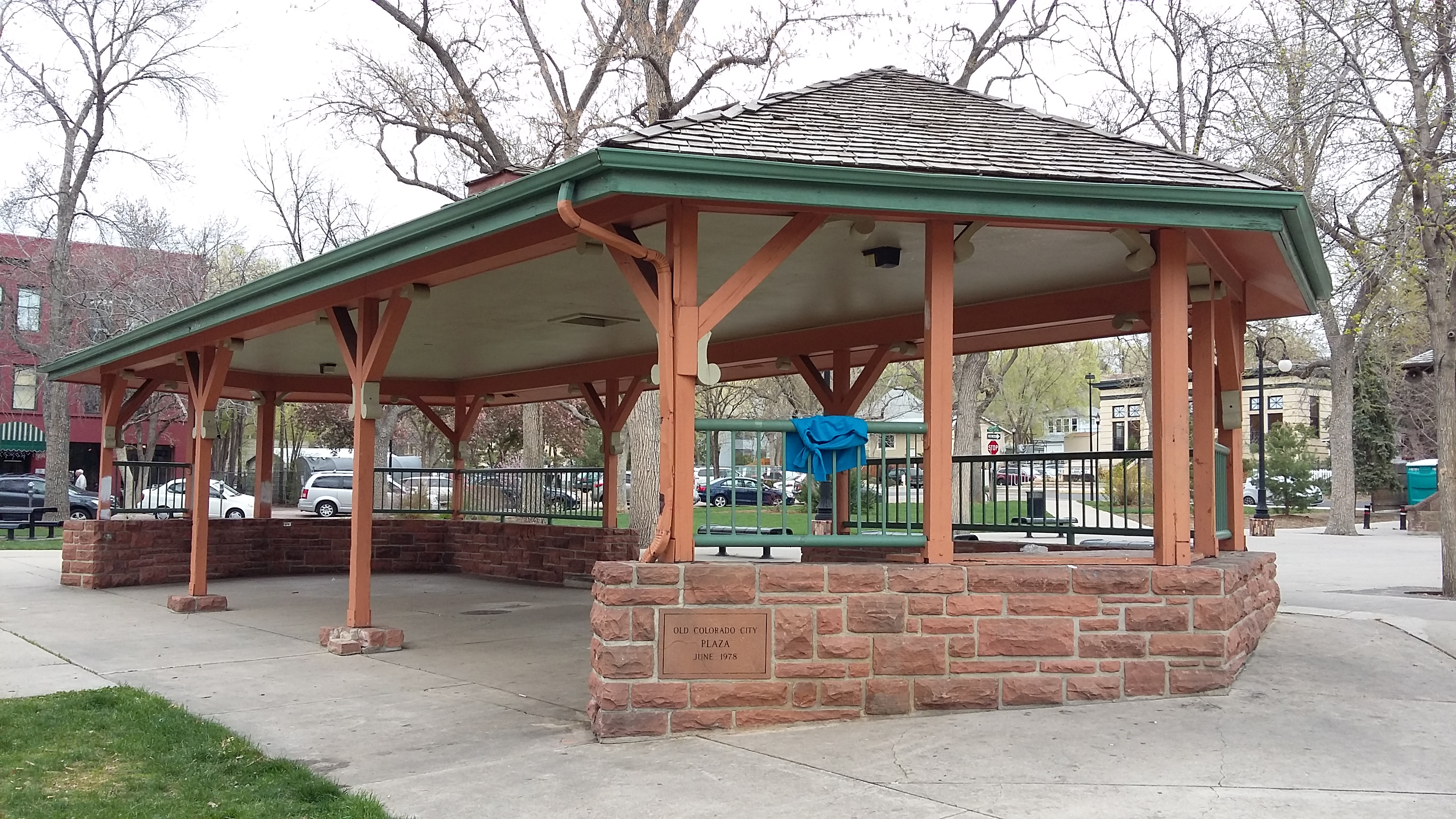
Old Colorado City Plaza at Bancroft Park

== See also ==
- National Register of Historic Places listings in El Paso County, Colorado
- Manitou Springs, Colorado
