= Golden Cycle Mining and Reduction Company =

Golden Cycle Mill, Old Colorado City, 1947, Pikes Peak Library District digital collection

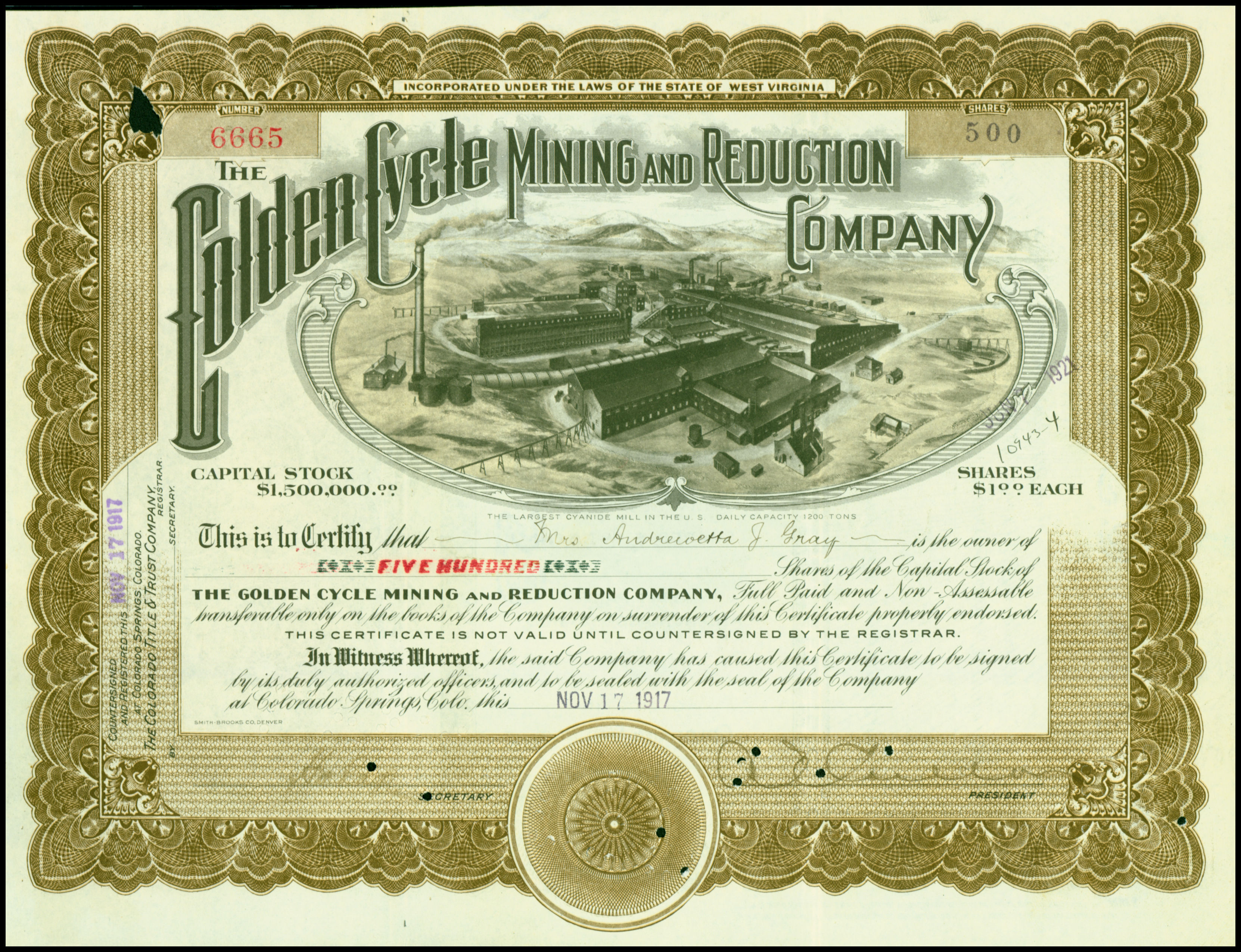
Share of the Golden Cycle Mining and Reduction Company, issued 17. November 1917

Golden Cycle Mining and Reduction Company was a mining company in Colorado City (now Old Colorado City) in El Paso County, Colorado. The company was incorporated in West Virginia and was listed on the Colorado Springs Exchange. Albert E. Carlton was part owner of the Golden Cycle. Directors included Carlton, Spencer Penrose, Richard Roelofs, H. McGarry, L.G. Carlton, Bulkeley Wells.

Golden Cycle controlled the Pikes Peak Consolidated Fuel Company, which had 15,000,000 tons of marketable coal, a 50% interest in East Colorado Springs Land Company, held more than a third interest in United Gold Mines in Cripple Creek and owned 400 acres in Cripple Creek. It operated a custom mill, treating up to 40,000 tons of Cripple Creek ore each month. The mill includes rolls, roasting furnaces and cyanide equipment.

The Golden Cycle Mine was sold to Vindicator Consolidated Gold Mining in 1915 for $1,300,000 (equivalent to $40,406,908 in 2024). This was part of an overall plan by Carlton to consolidate or merge Vindicator, Golden Cycle, Cresson, Elkton, Union Gold, Findlay and Trail mines.

Golden Cycle Mining and Reduction Company purchased U.S. Reduction and Refining Company of Fremont County, Colorado in 1916 after several forced sales. Golden Cycle sold the extensive machinery to Morse Brothers of Denver.

By 1920, the company had decided to build a power plant near the Pikeview coal mine to supply power and light to Golden Cycle's subsidiaries nearby.

Most of the Cripple Creek properties of the Cripple Creek & Victor Gold Mine were consolidated into the Golden Cycle Mining and Reduction Company, and the Carlton Tunnel was completed in 1941. This 6.5-mile-long tunnel drained the district down to 3,000 feet. The roasting-cyanidation Carlton Mill opened in March 1951. This mill also tested the first carbon adsorption-desorption process.
