= Midland Terminal Railway =

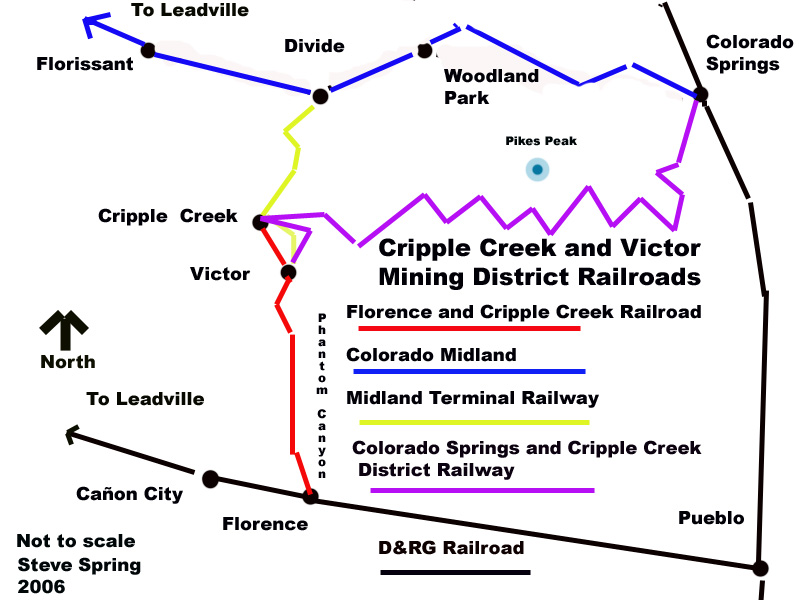

Overview
- Headquarters: 21st and Cimarron Streets; Colorado Springs, Colorado
- Reporting mark: MTR (expired)
- Locale: Colorado
- Dates of operation: 1893; 133 years ago–1949; 77 years ago
- Successor: abandoned

Technical
- Track gauge: 4 ft 8 1/2 in (1,435 mm) standard gauge
- Previous gauge: 3 ft (914 mm) gauge

The Midland Terminal Railway was a short line terminal railroad running from the Colorado Midland Railway near Divide to Cripple Creek, Colorado. The railroad made its last run in February 1949.

== Background ==
From 1887 to 1918, Colorado Midland Railroad operated rail service along a 222-mile line from Colorado City (now Old Colorado City), through Ute Pass and across the Continental Divide, to the coal-mining town of New Castle and Grand Junction. It was the first standard gauge railroad through the Rocky Mountains. Travelers heading for Cripple Creek would get off the train at Divide and take the Hundley Stage along the toll road to the town. In 1892, passengers could also travel to Cripple Creek from Canon City via the Florence and Cripple Creek Railroad, a narrow gauge line.

== History ==
When gold was discovered in Cripple Creek and Victor in 1890, some of the Colorado Midland owners (Note: Atchison, Topeka and Santa Fe Railroad was the majority owner of Colorado Midland after 1890.) formed the Midland Terminal Railroad, a standard gauge spur line from Divide to Cripple Creek. This allowed for passenger travel to and from Cripple Creek, shipment of equipment into the area, and the transport of ore to processing mills in Colorado City beginning in 1895. (Note: Construction began in 1893 with the first segment, a 7.1 miles (11.4 km) line between Divide and Midland was completed on December 9, 1893. This track was originally 3 ft (914 mm) narrow gauge. In January 1893, the Santa Fe Railway in conjunction with the local financiers tore up the narrow gauge track and ran a new survey for a 4 ft 8 1/2 in (1,435 mm) standard gauge track south on the new survey route to the town of Midland which was midway between Divide and Cripple Creek. The track reached the town of Gillette on July 4, 1894. It continued south, reaching the Portland Mine north of Victor by December 16, 1894 and Victor Junction by mid-January 1895. During 1895 a branch in Victor was built and extended near to Independence Mine. The line reached the town of Anaconda by the autumn of 1895 and Cripple Creek in December 1895.) It was the only standard gauge railroad into Cripple Creek and Victor, which made for easy transfer of material at the Divide junction with the Colorado Midland Railway.

The Colorado Springs and Cripple Creek District Railway was built by 1911 to transport ore from the Cripple Creek mining district through the mountains—on what is now Gold Camp Road or Teller County 8—directly to the processing facilities in Old Colorado City. Eleven miles shorter distance than the Colorado Midland Railway, it was nicknamed the "Short Line" and offered freight and passenger service. Transportation across the Short Line reduced the cost of shipment as compared to what had been paid to the Colorado Midland Railway. Colorado Midland Railway went into foreclosure in 1917 and Albert E. Carlton bought the company and ore began to be shipped through the Midland Terminal Railway to Old Colorado City. Expenses mounted after the United States Railroad Administration began shipping materials to supply World War I troops through the Colorado Midland Railway lines, across railroad tracks and beds not able to accommodate the additional trains and tonnage. By August 1918 the railway ceased operations.

In 1919, the terminal facilities at Old Colorado City and the abandoned tracks between Old Colorado City and Divide were sold to the Midland Terminal Railway, owned by Carlton and Spencer Penrose. The following year the line through Victor was extended to La Bella Junction. Passengers, mail, and ore was transported along the now Midland Terminal Railway tracks from Cripple Creek to Old Colorado City, but scheduled passenger service ended in 1931. After 1934, 90% of the railroad's business was transporting ore to the Golden Cycle Mining and Reduction Company, which was the only remaining ore processing facility in Old Colorado City. There was some freight and ore shipped across the rails during World War II, but business dropped off thereafter. The railway had abandoned the Taylor Switchback to the Independence Mine in 1930 and in 1948 a total of 64.5 miles (103.8 km) of track from Old Colorado Springs to Cripple Creek, within the Cripple Creek mining district, and the spur in Old Colorado City to the Golden Cycle Mining and Reduction Company. (Note: The Westside Pioneer stated that just two special passenger trains ran in 1949 prior to the Midland line shutting down that year.)

== Legacy ==
Some of the old buildings at the Midland Terminal headquarters in Colorado Springs are in use today, notably the old roundhouse, which was purchased by Van Briggle Pottery in 1955, and the machine shop, which is now the Ghost Town Museum. U.S. Route 24 follows the former railroad's route over Ute Pass.

Two miles of the former railroad's right of way is currently used by the Cripple Creek and Victor Narrow Gauge Railroad. Another segment is being converted to a multi-use trail connecting the Pikes Peak Greenway to Manitou Springs. Portions of the roadbed and right of way from Divide, Colorado, to Cripple Creek, Colorado, are in use as Highway 67. A former wood-shored Midland Terminal tunnel was used as a one-lane highway tunnel on CO 67 until the 1990s; after a partial collapse the tunnel was bypassed with a new cut and the tunnel remains as a landmark, its ends are closed with a grille so the interior and shoring can be seen today.

== See also ==
- Colorado Springs and Cripple Creek District Railway
- Cripple Creek and Victor Narrow Gauge Railroad
