= History of Colorado Springs, Colorado =

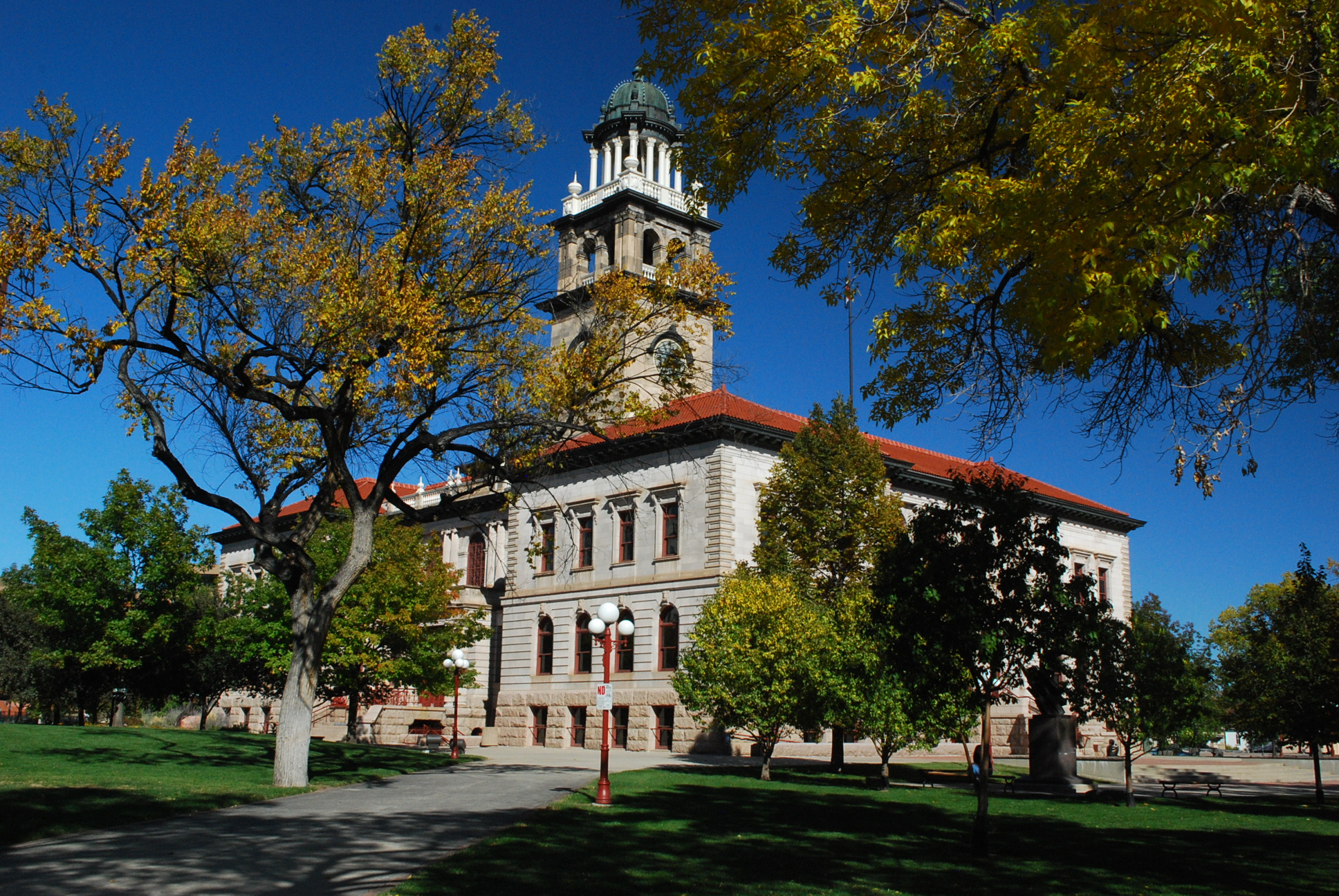
- The 1903-1973 El Paso County Courthouse (now the Colorado Springs Pioneers Museum).
- Country: United States
- State: Colorado
- County: El Paso
- Municipality: City of Colorado Springs
- Population history: 2010: 416,427 (city), 678,319 (metropolitan area); 2000: 352,176 (city), 516,929 (metropolitan area); 1990: 397,014; 1980: 309,524; 1970: 235,972; 1960: 143,742; 1950: 45,472; 1912: 35,000; 1910: 32,000; 1895: < 20,000; 1890: 28,546; 1880: 17,406; 1879: 5,000-5,500

This article details the history of the City of Colorado Springs, Colorado, the United States from its development in 1859 as part of the American frontier to the present. Old Colorado City was Colorado Springs capital during the Pike's Peak Gold Rush was the Colorado Territory capital. The town of Colorado Springs was founded by General William Jackson Palmer as a resort town. Old Colorado City was annexed into Colorado Springs. Railroads brought tourists and visitors to the area from other parts of the United States and abroad. The city was noted for junctions for seven railways: Denver and Rio Grande (1870), Denver and New Orleans Manitou Branch (1882), Colorado Midland (1886–1918), Colorado Springs and Interurban (1887-1932 horse/electric tram), Atchison, Topeka, and Santa Fe (1889), Rock Island (1889), and Colorado Springs and Cripple Creek (1900-22 Short Line) Railways. It was also known for mining exchanges and brokers for the Cripple Creek Gold Rush.

Palmer, Spencer Penrose, and Winfield Scott Stratton provided land and funding for parks, buildings, and non-profit organizations. It was a home to successful mine owners, artists, and writers. The climate and mountain setting made it a popular tourist destination and health resort. A dry climate supported resorts for people with weak lungs or tuberculosis, including the 19th and 20th century Colorado Springs sanatoria.

The city supported three World War II and Cold War military installations. The North American Aerospace Defense Command (NORAD) center was located within the city before relocating to Cheyenne Mountain.

== Geological history ==
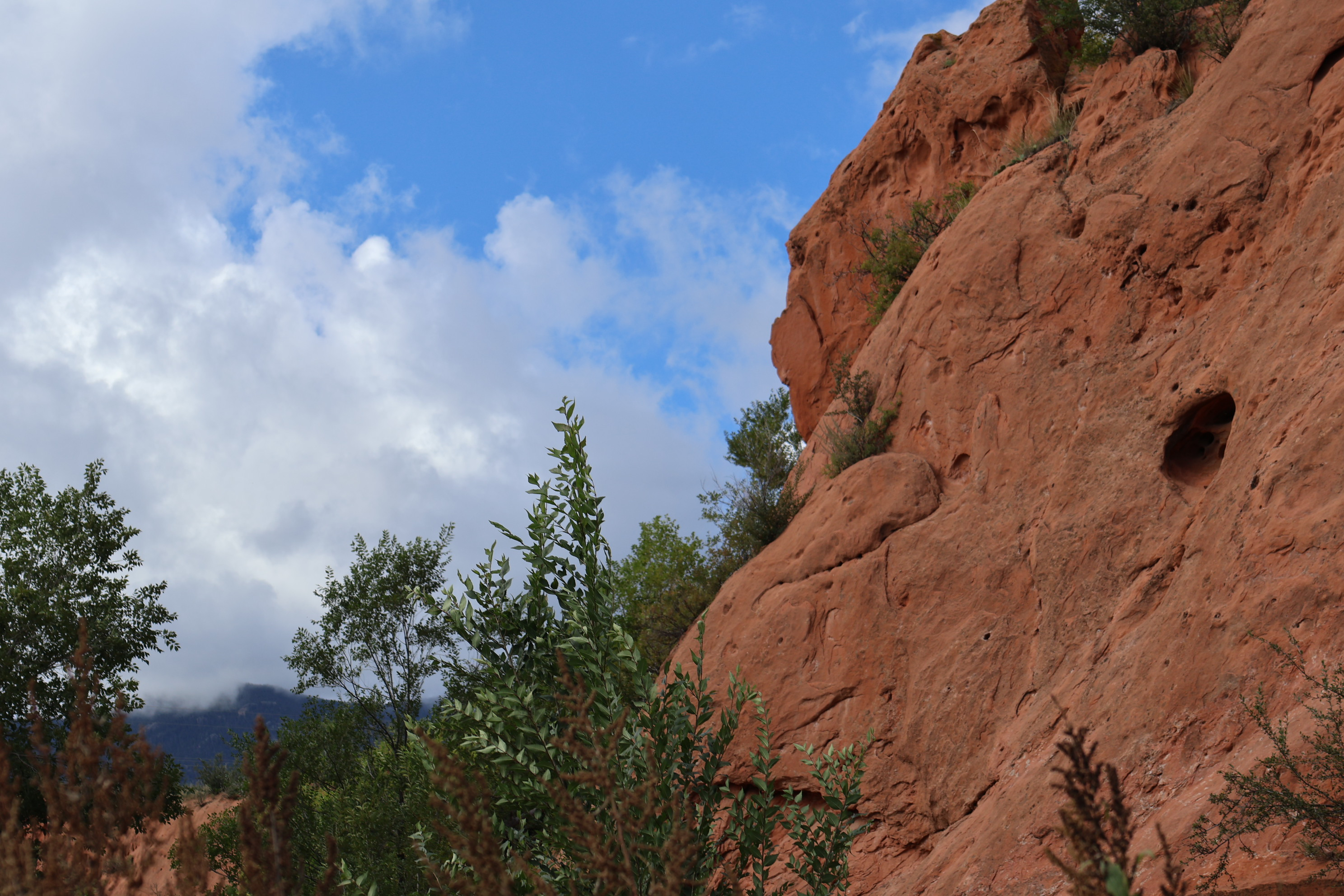
Red Rock Canyon Open Space, Colorado Springs, Colorado

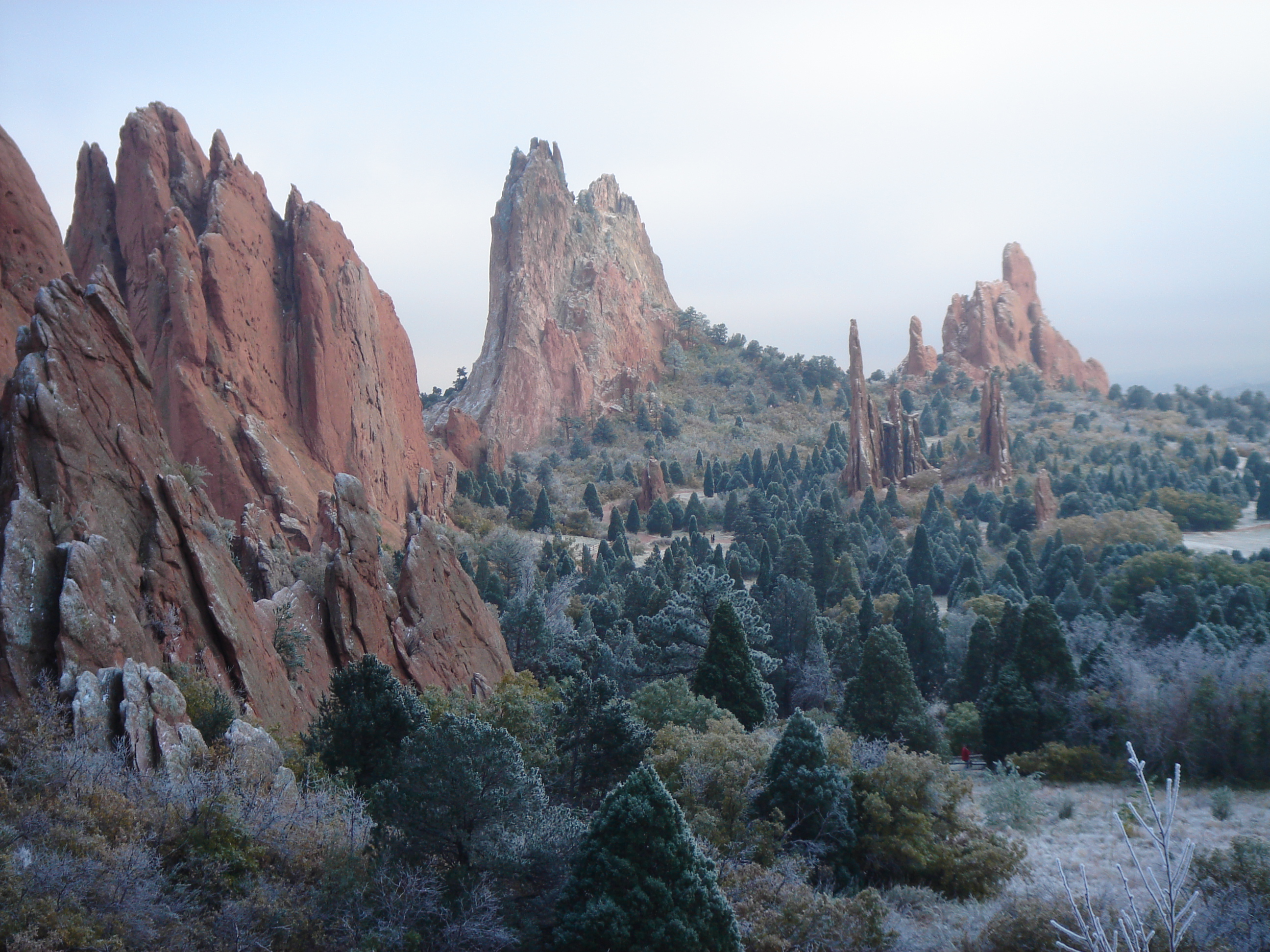
The Garden of the Gods is one of the city's Pennsylvanian age's Fountain Formations. Another is the Red Rock Canyon Open Space

Notable landforms, such as the Cheyenne Mountain on the city's southwest, were formed of Precambrian Pikes Peak granite uplifted in the Ancestral Rocky Mountains. Formation of the city's hills—including the Mesa, Institute Heights, and Knob Hill—created valleys for the Camp, Cheyenne, and Fountain creeks which enter the city on the west; Monument Creek from the north; and Cottonwood & Sand creeks (east).

Bluffs formed with American Lower Eocene coal deposits of the Colorado Springs lignite field. Eponymic mineral springs, which flowed in 1912 from aquifers under the elevated landforms, included Horn's Mineral Springs at 1210 Lincoln, Monument Springs on Monument Creek's west bank in Monument Valley Park, and Jimmy's Camp Springs. There were also other springs located at that time on Bijou, Kiowa, 7th, and Cucharra streets and West Cheyenne Road.

== Before founding ==
=== Native American settlements ===
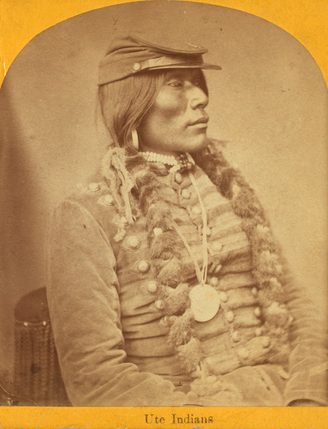
A Ute Indian photograph by Robert N. Dennis

Ute people have believed that the Pikes Peak region is their home. Their name for Pikes Peak is Tavakiev, meaning Sun Mountain. They lived a nomadic hunter-gatherer lifestyle. Summers were spent in the mountains, which was considered by other tribes to be the domain of the Utes. In the fall they would travel down Ute Pass (Note: The Ute Pass Trail was the "old Indian trail...ran across the hills just south of the Garden of the Gods and out into the valley of Camp Creek through a gap in the ridge at what was afterwards known as the Chambers Ranch, then across Camp Creek and over the Mesa, crossing Monument Creek just above the present town of Roswell".) and visit the springs where they "made offerings to the spirits of the springs for good health and good hunting". From there they began a journey eastward to hunt buffalo. They spent winters in mountain valleys where they were protected from the weather. Garden of the Gods artifacts from up to 3,500 years ago, such as grinding stones, "suggests the groups would gather together after their hunt to complete the tanning of hides and processing of meat." For instance, grinding stones found there from c. 1330 B.C. were used by the Ute people.

Arapaho, Cheyenne, and other tribes also gathered in the Manitou Springs and Garden of the Gods areas. Cheyenne Mountain, named after the Cheyenne people was considered a great source of timber for teepee poles. Waterfalls were believed by the Cheyenne and Arapaho to be a spiritual place where one might gain inspiration, which may have been why they visited the local Cañons.

By 1882, Utes were forced to live on reservations in southwestern Colorado and eastern Utah.

=== Treaties and settler exploration ===
Part of the American frontier, Colorado Springs land was in New France (1682 treaty), New Spain (1762 treaty), and the United States' Louisiana Purchase beginning in 1803. When the region was bought by the United States with the Louisiana Purchase, explorers entered the area. Zebulon Pike explored the region in November 1806. The land including the current city was designated part of the 1854 Kansas Territory and on June 24, 1857, a team of Major John Sedgwick's Column camped at the mouth of Jimmy Camp Creek. (Note: There were also 1776, 1806, & 1820 expedition explorers—Juan Bautista de Anza, Zebulon Pike, Stephen Harriman Long— that passed south of the city limits. Don Juan Bautista de Anza visited the area from New Mexico and created a map that shows Almagre, the Spanish name given to what became Pikes Pike. Meaning red earth, Almagre (AL-MA-GREY) is description of the mountains pinkish rocks. During his visit in 1776, he surprised a small force of the Comanche near present day Colorado Springs and in Pueblo fought and won a battle with the Comanche.) In 1858, a subsequent April US Army camp was near Soda Spring in Manitou Springs, and the Lawrence Party camped at Garden of the Gods in July before establishing a town in or after September of that year at Montana City, which is now part of Denver, Colorado.

== Foundation ==
=== Gold rush settlement ===
Colorado City, now called Old Colorado City, was founded at the confluence of Fountain and Camp creeks on August 13, 1859, making it the first Pikes Peak region settlement. The Colorado City area became part of the Jefferson Territory on October 24 and of El Paso County on November 28, 1859. From November 5, 1861, until August 14, 1862 (including one legislative session), the city was the Colorado Territory capital. It then moved to Golden, before it was finally moved to Denver in 1867.

Roads into the area included a toll road that connected to the northeast with the Overland's 1865 "Despatch Express Route". Southward out of Colorado City a stage road (now Old Stage Road) traversed through South Cheyenne Creek's canyon to Cripple Creek, and a carriage road through North and South Cheyenne Canyons and westward was the Ute Pass Wagon Road. Another route into the area was the north–south Cherokee Trail / Jimmy Camp Trail, which was near the Goodnight–Loving Trail. The Jimmy Camp Trail was one branch of the Trapper's Trail, a trail used by trappers and explorers from 1820 and during the gold rush. Trapper's Trail ran north–south from Fort Laramie to the El Pueblo trading post in the present Pueblo County, and from there branched off to Bent's Old Fort or Taos, New Mexico.

=== Colorado Springs founding and incorporation ===
Civil War General William Jackson Palmer came to the Colorado Territory as a surveyor with the Kansas Pacific Railway in search of possible railroad routes. Dr. William Abraham Bell from England was also part of the survey party. Having viewed the valley in the shadow of Pikes Peak as an ideal town site in July 1869, Palmer and Bell founded Fountain Colony, downstream of Colorado City, on July 31, 1871, and it was laid out by the Colorado Springs Company that year. (Note: In reaction to the saloons, prostitution, and opium dens of Colorado City, Palmer purchased the land for the new town east of the wild town and outlawed the consumption of alcohol within the new town's borders. Alcohol was sold, however, by druggists for "medicinal purposes". In 1933, at the end of Prohibition, Colorado Springs lifted the ban of the sale and consumption of alcohol.) The town was named Colorado Springs by 1879. It was named for springs found along Monument Creek as early as 1871. Four chalybeate mineral springs were later discovered along Monument Creek in October 1880.

The El Paso County seat transferred from Colorado City in 1873 to the Town of Colorado Springs. Early infrastructure included 60 miles (97 km) of irrigation canals along streets and a drinking water supply from Manitou's Ruxton Creek by 1879. Water was diverted to the Ruxton Creek Basin from the Middle Beaver Creek basin in 1889.

The town was "Little London" for the many English tourists and settlers actively recruited by Palmer's English associate Dr. William Abraham Bell and Palmer's English financial backers who provided the capital for his railroad, Denver and Rio Grande Railroad served the city beginning October 1871. In 1873 Colorado Springs became the county seat for the county; Previously, Old Colorado City was the county seat.

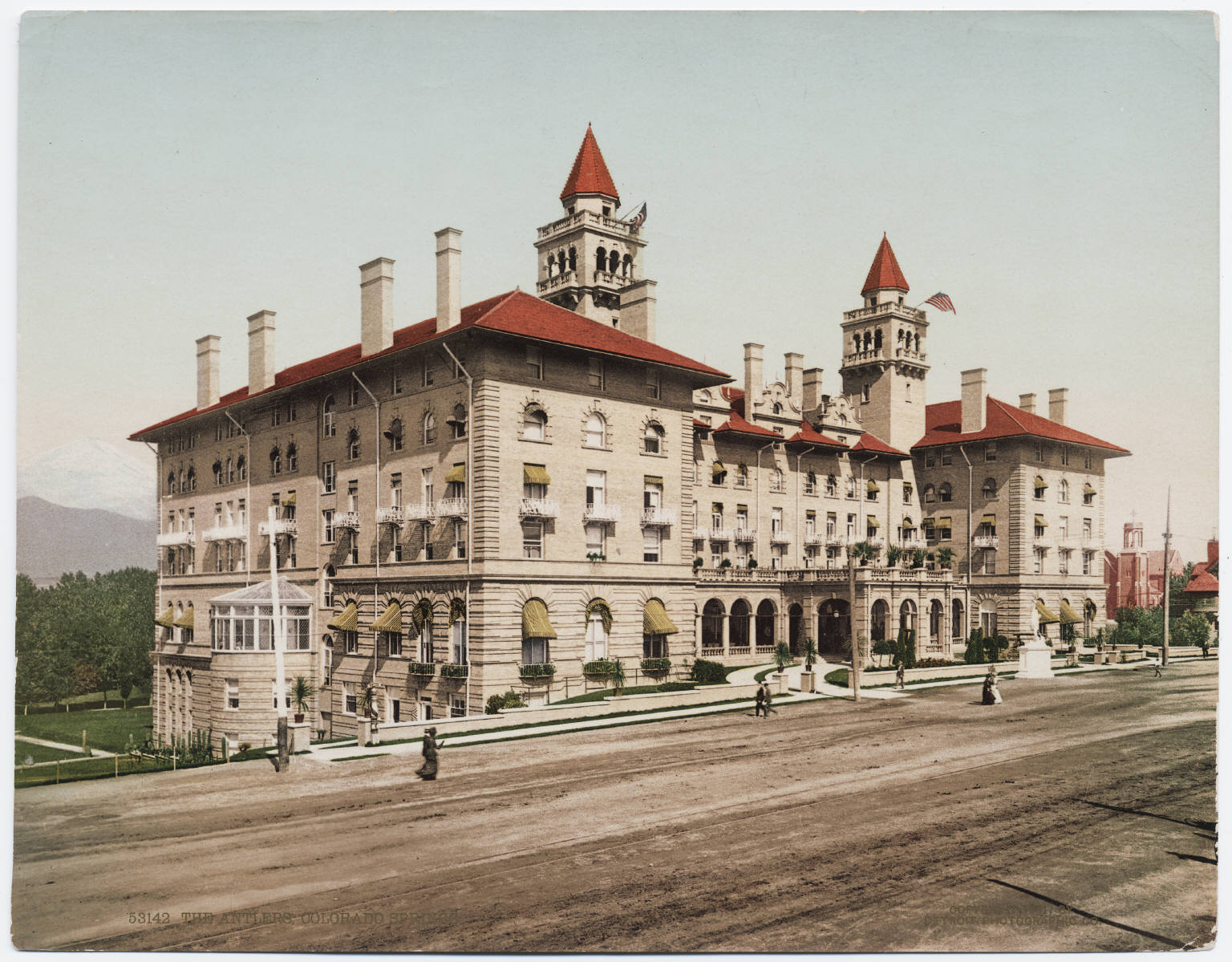
The second Antlers Hotel, built in 1898

The Pikes Peak region was one of the most popular travel destinations in the late 19th century United States. The town saw an influx of writers, artists and people from England in the late 1870s, some of whom made their home in the town. Some of the key attractions were Garden of the Gods, Glen Eyrie, Pikes Peak, and Cheyenne Canyon. (Note: The waters in Colorado Springs contained so much natural fluoride that some peoples' teeth developed Colorado Stain. In 1909, Dr. Frederick McKay of Colorado Springs discovered the Colorado Stain connection and that a little fluoride added to water would prevent cavities.)

Domestic and international travelers were drawn to the high altitude, sunshine, mineral waters, and dry climate. The town was described as "a veritable Eden for consumptive invalids". At the peak of its period as a health resort for tuberculosis treatment in Colorado Springs, there were 17 tuberculosis hospitals in the area. The permanent residents fear of catching the highly contagious disease nearly resulted in a state bill that would have required tubercular patients to wear bells to announce their presence.

The Colorado School for the Deaf and Blind and Colorado College were founded in 1874. Palmer opened the Antlers Hotel in 1882. Colorado Springs incorporated on June 19, 1886,

== After settlement ==
=== Late 19th century and early 20th century ===
Key Historic Districts and Places

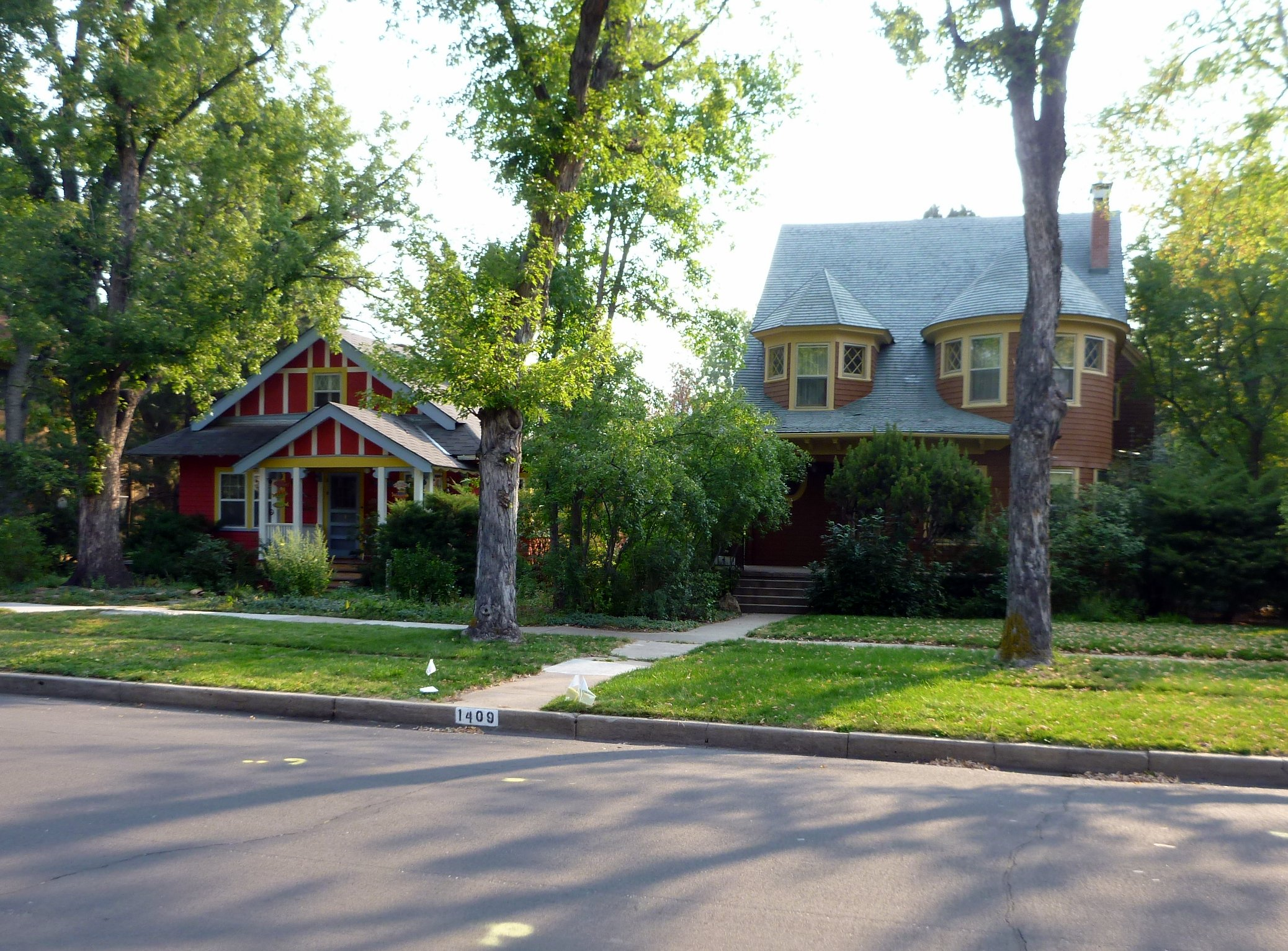
North End Historic District

- Boulder Crescent Place Historic District
- Broadmoor
- Cragmor
- El Pomar Estate
- Glen Eyrie
- Monument Valley Park
- Old North End Historic District
- North Weber Street-Wahsatch Avenue
- Old Colorado City
- Rock Ledge Ranch

Colorado Midland Railroad began service in the town in 1885. Chicago, Rock Island and Pacific Railroad service began in 1889. Trolleys ran to Manitou Springs the following year. Colorado Springs grew by 164% when 11,140 people settled in the town between 1880 and 1890.

After the Cripple Creek gold discovery in 1891, the people who made a fortune from the gold rush and industry built large houses on Wood Avenue, then in the undeveloped downtown area of Colorado Springs. Several large stone buildings like Colorado College, St. Mary's Church, the first Antlers Hotel, the library, and the county courthouse were built on wide streets, in anticipation of significant population growth. By 1898, the city that had grown through annexations of Old Colorado City, Ivywild, Roswell and other towns was designated into quadrants by the north–south Cascade Avenue and the east–west Washington/Pike's Peak avenues, along with voting precincts 27-41 and five wards with the fire alarm zones.

Inventor Nikola Tesla built and operated his wireless power experimental station in 1899 on Knob Hill, near the current intersection of Foote and Kiowa Streets. Governor James Hamilton Peabody sent troops to Colorado City in 1903 to settle a miner's strike. They set up Camp Peabody at what became the 1903 Colorado Labor War. (Note: Old Colorado City was the location of a 1903 labor strike that spread to Cripple Creek and eventually led to the Colorado Labor Wars.) According to Mrs. Gilbert McClurg, reported in the Colorado Springs Gazette, General Palmer visited the west bank of Monument Creek and located a lost mineral spring so that it was included in his plans for Monument Valley Park. By 1905, the lake at Monument Valley Park was built at a cost of US$750,000 (equivalent to $26,875,000 in 2025), the YMCA building was built for $100,000 (equivalent to $3,583,000 in 2025), and Broadmoor Country Club built one of the city's two polo fields.

There was a plan in 1911 plan to build a Colorado Springs Union Depot to consolidate the two railroad passenger depots, but it was never completed. A zoological park was built along Cheyenne Creek, near Bear Creek Road (now Eighth Street), by 1916 and the Cheyenne Mountain Zoo was built in 1925 above The Broadmoor resort on the Cheyenne Mountain Zoo Road. In 1919, William Kennon Jewett deeded the Colorado Springs Golf Club's golf course to the City of Colorado Springs. Aircraft flights to the Broadmoor neighborhood fields began in 1919, the Alexander Airport (later called Nichols Field) north of the city opened in 1925 and land was purchased in 1927 for the first Colorado Springs Municipal Airport.

Successful mine owner Winfield Scott Stratton funded the Myron Stratton Home for housing itinerant children and the elderly, donated land for City Hall, the main post office, the Courthouse, and a park; he also greatly expanded the city's trolley car system and built the Mining Exchange building. Spencer Penrose and his wife, over the course of their lives, financed construction of The Broadmoor resort (1918), Pikes Peak Highway, Cheyenne Mountain Zoo (1921), Will Rogers Shrine of the Sun (1937), made a significant donation to what is now known as Penrose-St Francis Health Services, and established the El Pomar Foundation, which still oversees many of his contributions in Colorado Springs today. A bronze sculpture of Palmer on a horse was unveiled in 1929. To many residents who lived in Colorado Springs in the years since, Palmer became known as "the man on the iron horse".

Many of the large homes in Colorado Springs were made into apartment houses or became boarding houses during the Depression of the 1930s and when there was a housing shortage during World War II. Some homes were also converted into office space.

=== Land purchases and annexation ===
City-owned properties that are, or were originally, outside of the city limits include:

- Colorado Springs Airport (annexed 1964)
- North Cheyenne Cañon Park
- Evergreen Cemetery (1.5 mi SE in 1898)
- Manitou Hydroelectric Plant (bought 1905)
- Pikes Peak Highway
- Pikes Peak Meadows (annexed c. 1985)
- Original Colorado Springs Municipal Airport
- Tesla Hydroelectric Plant (at USAFA); torn down in 1964

Colorado Springs annexed Roswell in 1880. The city purchased 640 acres in North Cheyenne Cañon after citizens of Colorado Springs voted for the measure in 1885.

Between 1889 and 1890 Seavey's Addition, West Colorado Springs, East End, and another North End addition were annexed to the city. In 1891, the Broadmoor Land Company began developing the Broadmoor suburb and built the Broadmoor Casino. By December 12, 1895, the city had "four Mining Exchanges and 275 mining brokers." Silver Cascade Falls, Helen Hunt Falls, N. Cheyenne Canyon Road and other land in North Cheyenne were purchased and donated to the city in 1907 by William Jackson Palmer. The cañon was considered by the Park Commission to be "by far the grandest and most popular of all the beautiful cañons near the city." Several areas near downtown, such as North End and Wood Avenue were annexed by 1912 and Colorado City (now called Old Colorado City) was annexed in 1917. After a lull between 1917 and 1946, annexation began in earnest. Some examples of annexed areas are: Pleasant Valley (1950), Knob Hill (1952), Austin Bluffs (1958–1965), Pike View (1962), Papeton (1968), Woodmen Valley (1969), and Stratton Additions (1966–1971).

Between 1960 and 1970 divisions of Cheyenne Mountain, Elmere, Black Forest-Peyton, Fountain, Pikes Peak and Monument were annexed into Colorado Springs, resulting in an increased population of 37,500 by 1970. Broadmoor and Skyway were annexed, without a vote of its residents, before the state's Poundstone Amendment (1974) was enacted. Briargate was annexed in 1982.

==== Parks ====
The first city park in Colorado Springs, included in the initial town plans in 1871, is Acacia Park. It was initially called Acacia Square or North Park. General William Jackson Palmer donated land to establish Acacia and additional parks, including: Antlers Park, Monument Valley Park, North Cheyenne Cañon, Palmer Park, Pioneer Square (South) Park, Prospect Lake and Bear Creek Cañon Park. He donated a total of 1,270 acres of land, some of which was also used for scenic drives, tree-lined roadways and foot and bridle paths. The Perkins heirs donated Garden of the Gods to the city in 1909.

=== Military installations ===
Military units/operations were also posted in other buildings within the city limits:

- 1942: ATSF Depot
- 1942: Alamo Garage (20th Combat Mapping Sq)
- 1942: City Auditorium
- 1942: Kaufman Building
- 1963: Chidlaw Building
- 1985: Temporary Military Facility
- 1990: Federal Building
- 1999: Atrium II (GPS Support Center)
- 2002: Atrium II (Space Analysis Center)
- 2003: Space Operations School

The city purchased land at the southern border of the city and donated it to the War Department. After the Pearl Harbor attack, the U.S. Army established Camp Carson, named for General Kit Carson, near the southern borders of the city as a training facility in preparation for World War II. Colorado Springs Municipal Airport was used by the Colorado Springs Army Air Base and was assigned to the Air Force in 1942 for photo reconnaissance training. It was renamed Peterson Field for Lt. Edward J. Peterson who died during a takeoff from the field.

After World War II there was little military presence in the city. Camp Carson had only 600 soldiers. When the Korean War began there was an influx of military personnel. Over time, Camp Carson grew and became a significant industry within the city. In 1951, the United States Air Defense Command moved to Colorado Springs and opened Ent Air Force Base.

In 1954 Camp Carson became Fort Carson. That year the United States Air Force Academy was established.

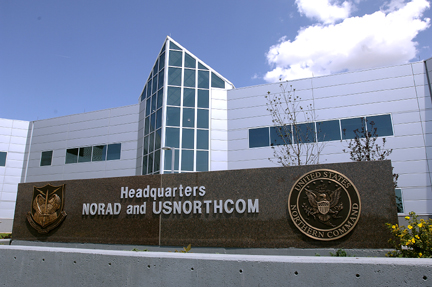
NORAD headquarters, 2006

NORAD's main facility was built in Cheyenne Mountain, which permanently secured the city's military presence and as a result increased the city's revenue, and opened in 1966. Ent Air Force Base was shut down and in 1977 was converted into the United States Olympic Training Center. Peterson Field was renamed Peterson Air Force Base and was permanently activated.

In 1983 Falcon Air Force Base, (later Schriever Air Force Base), was founded as a missile defense and satellite control center. Air Force Space Command is located on Peterson AFB.

=== Late 20th and early 21st century ===
Between 1965 and 1968 the University of Colorado at Colorado Springs, Pikes Peak Community College and the Colorado Technical University were established in the city. In 1969 Floyd W. Pettie became the first black person elected to the Colorado Springs City Council.

In 1972, the city's first National Register of Historic Places designation was the 1903 El Paso County Courthouse. The first designated historic district was the 1979 Rock Ledge Ranch Historic Site. In 1977, most of the former Ent Air Force Base became the first US Olympic Training Center, and the US Olympic Committee moved there in 1978.

In 2012, the Waldo Canyon fire destroyed 346 homes and killed two people in the city.

== See also ==
- Timeline of Colorado Springs, Colorado

== Gallery ==
Commercial and public buildings

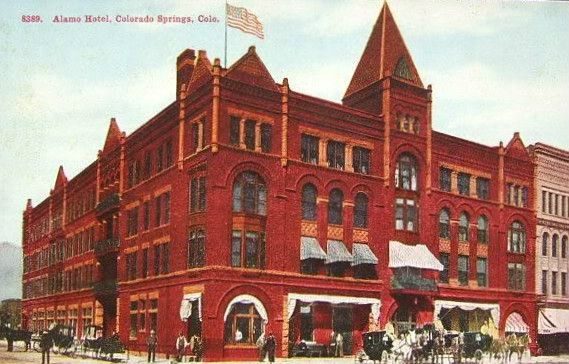
Alamo Hotel, 128 S. Tejon Street

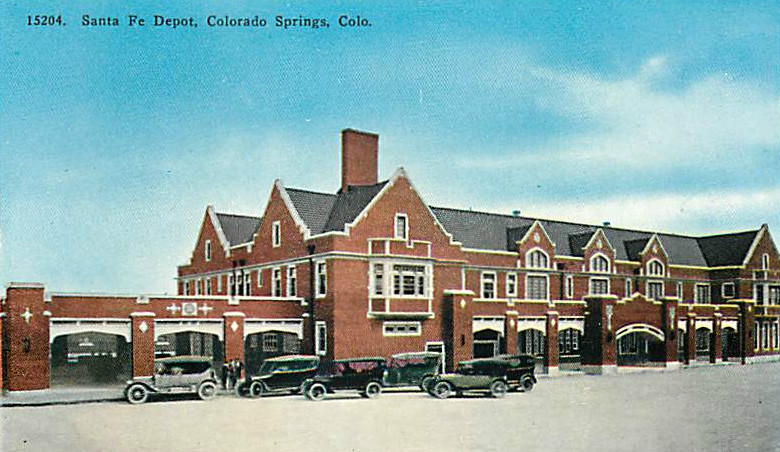
Atchison, Topeka and Santa Fe Passenger Depot, 555 E. Pikes Peak Avenue

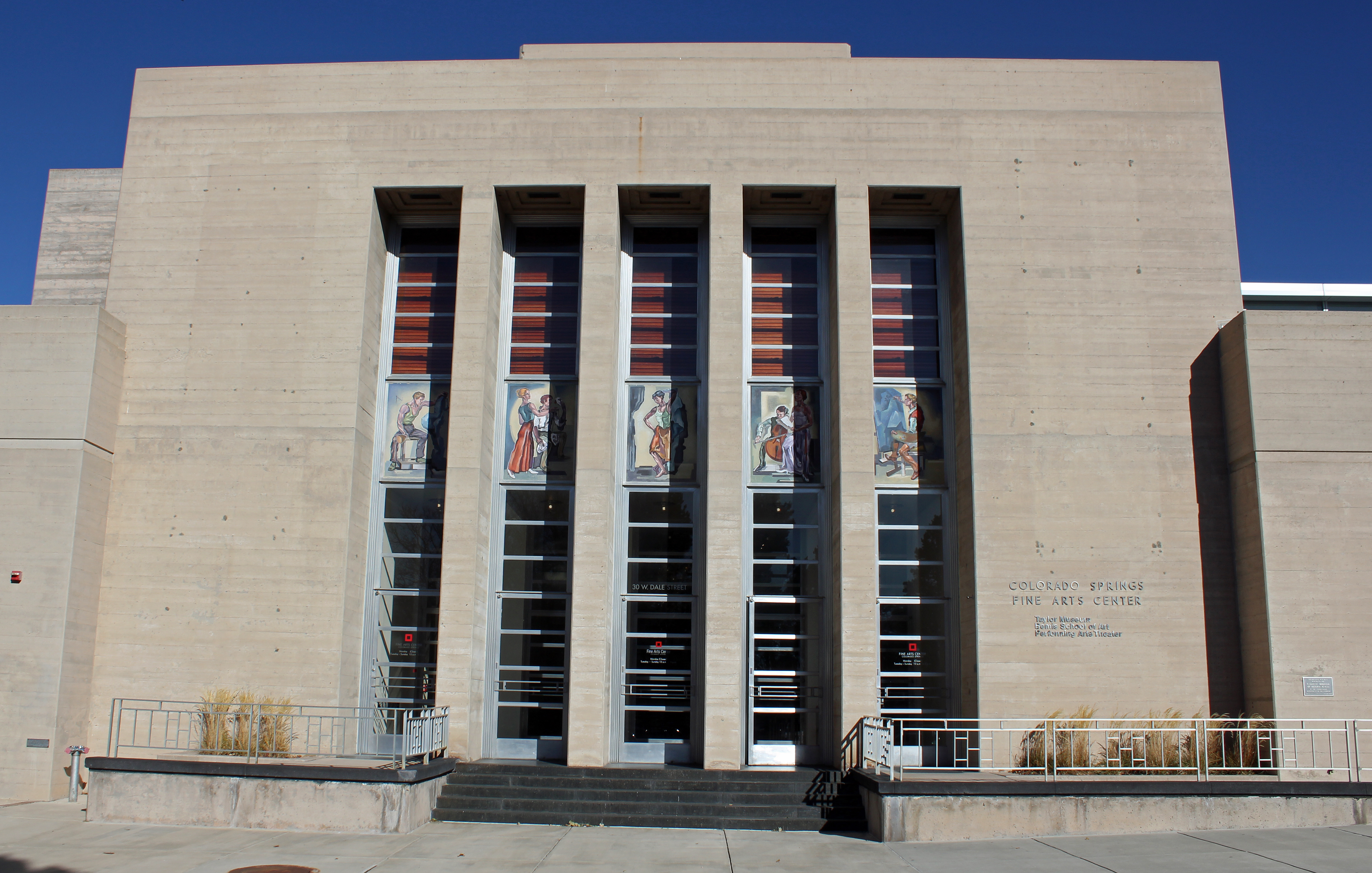
Colorado Springs Fine Arts Center, 30 W. Dale Street

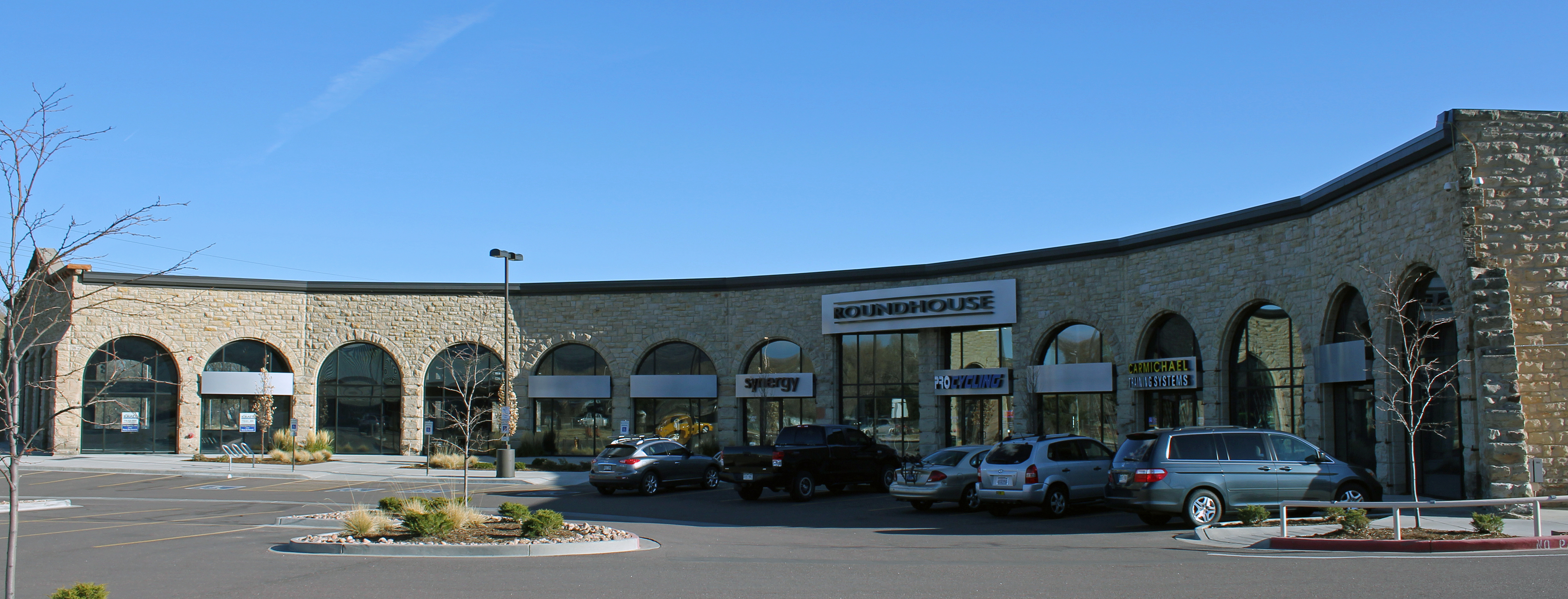
Midland Terminal Railroad Roundhouse, 600 S. 21st Street

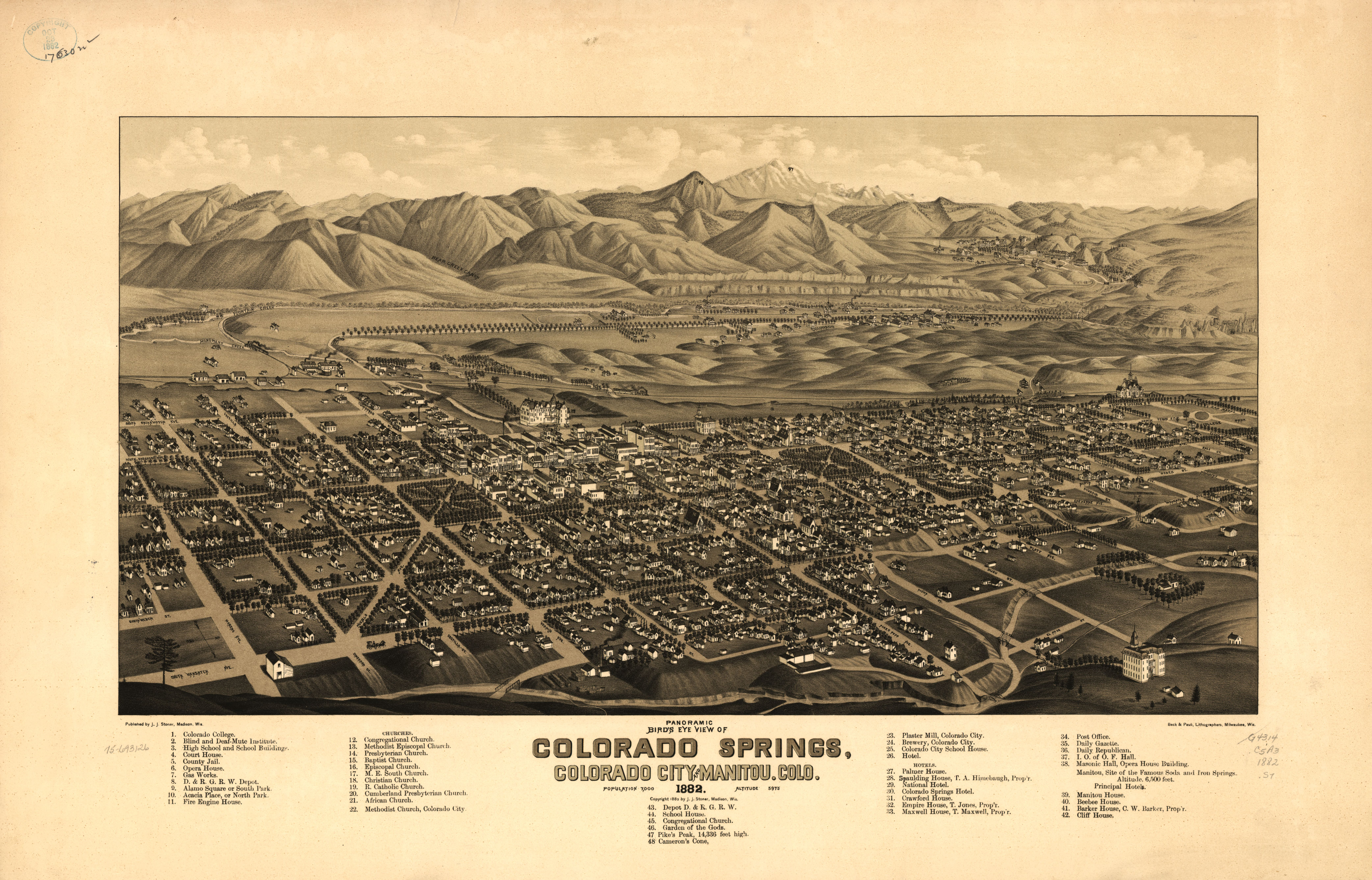
1882 Bird's Eye View of Colorado Springs and Manitou Springs, Colorado

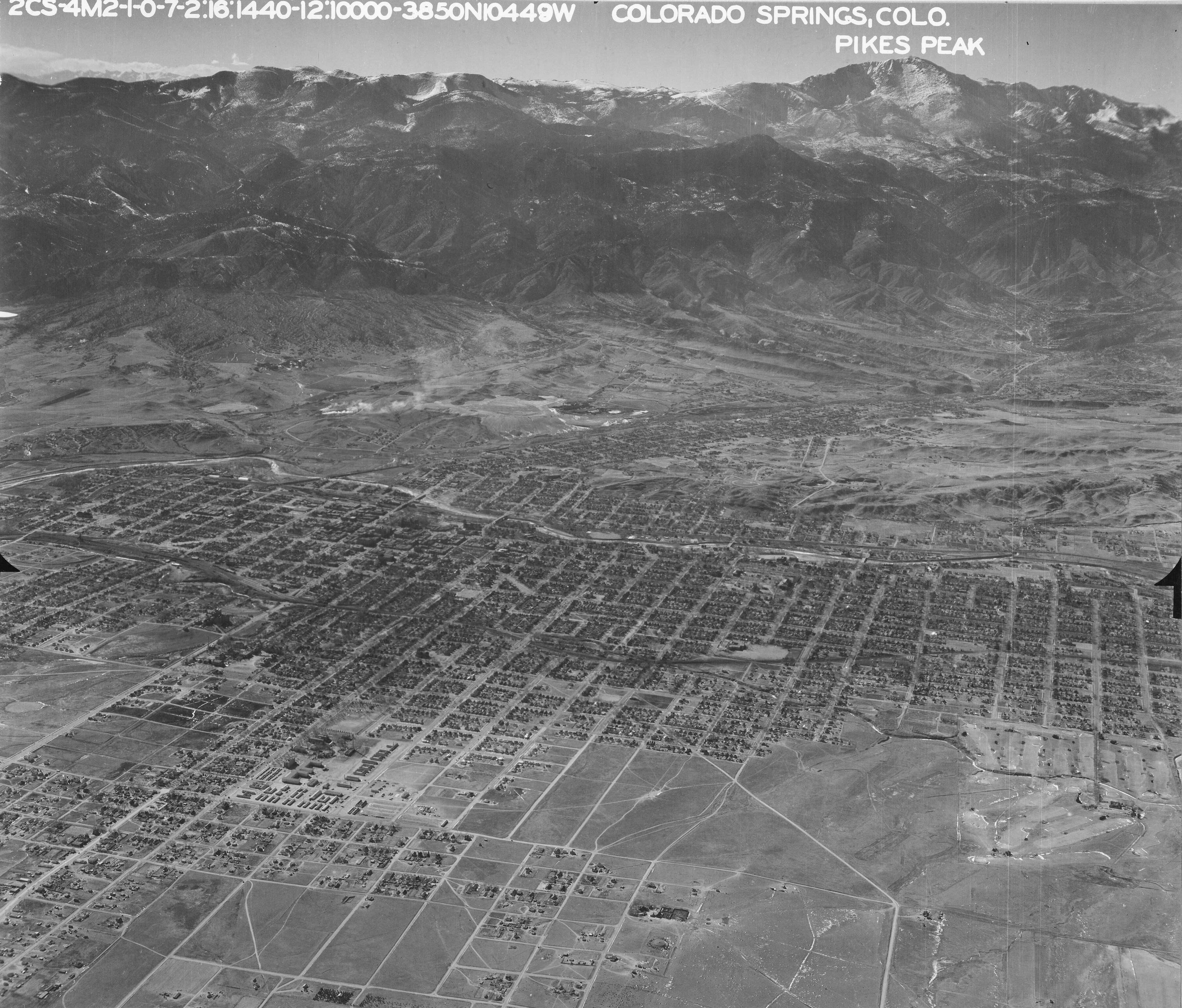
Bird's Eye View, 1944
