= Colorado Springs City Hall =

Municipal building in Colorado Springs, Colorado, U.S.

- U.S. National Register of Historic Places
- Colorado State Register of Historic Properties No. 5EP.652
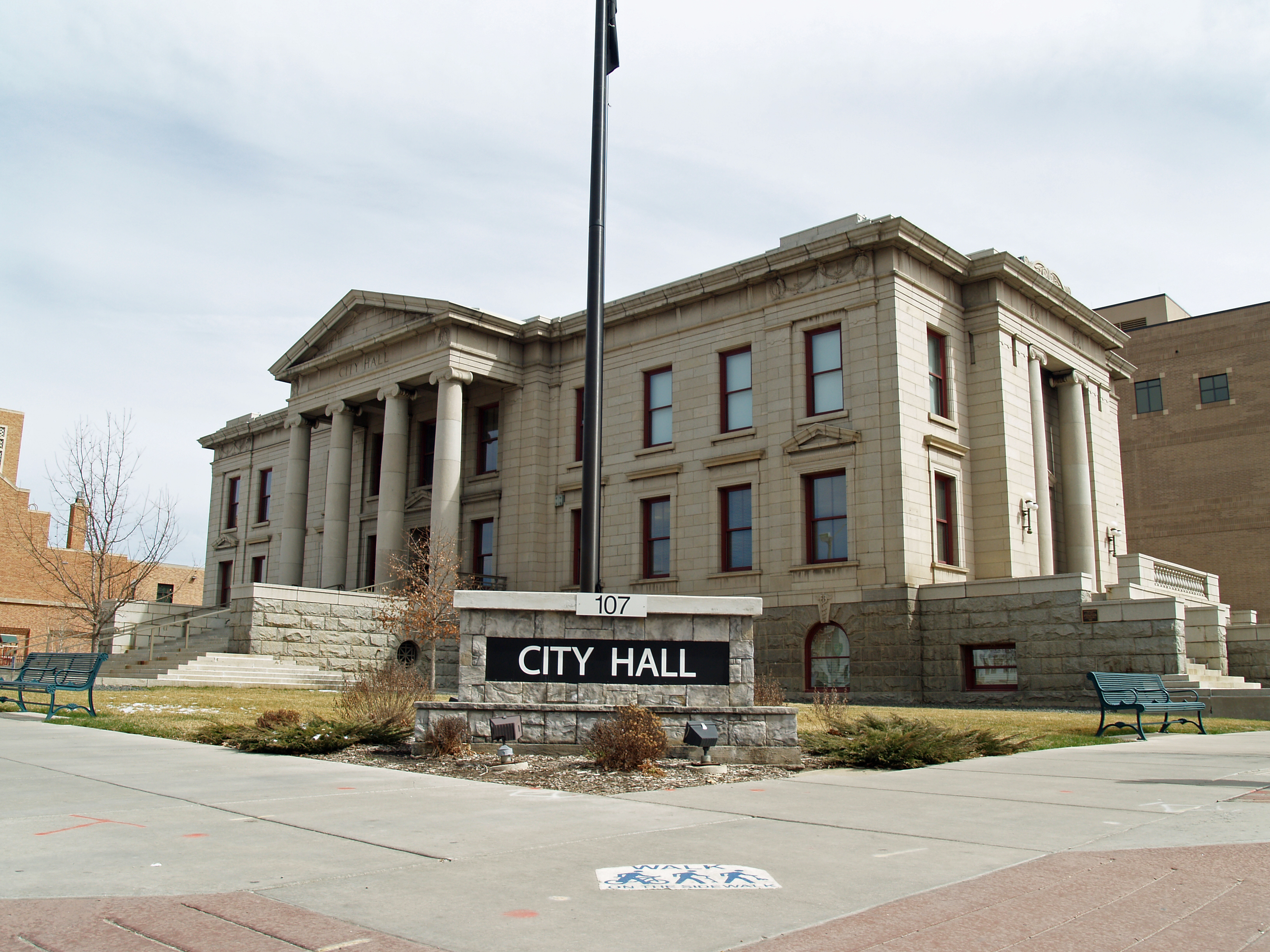

- Location within Colorado Location within the United States
- Location: 107 N. Nevada Avenue, Colorado Springs, Colorado, U.S.
- Coordinates: 38°50′8.19″N 104°49′15.59″W
- Built: 1904
- Architects: Thomas MacLaren and Thomas P. Barber
- Architectural style: Classical Revival
- NRHP reference No.: 02000075
- CSRHP No.: 5EP.652

Significant dates
- Added to NRHP: February 19, 2002
- Designated CSRHP: February 19, 2002

The Colorado Springs City Hall is a municipal building in Colorado Springs, Colorado. The building is on the National Register of Historic Places.

== History ==
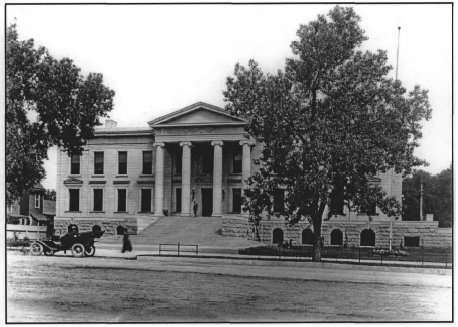
Colorado Springs City Hall - William Henry Jackson photograph, prior to 1921

Built in 1904, the 2 story Classical Revival building was the municipal center for the City of Colorado Springs until 1980. The building is constructed of Chaffee County granite. When the building was planned and constructed it was part of the City Beautiful movement. (Note: Other examples include the Colorado Springs City Auditorium, Main Post Office and the Colorado Springs Public Library-Carnegie Building.) Winfield Scott Stratton donated the money to purchase the property for the City Hall. The Classical Revival building was designed by Thomas P. Barber and Thomas MacLaren, the city's "premier architect" at the time. It has stone columns on a pedimented portico, domed and stained glass window rotunda, and elevated entrance. Inside the council chambers are paneled and the building includes a scagliola wainscot in the rotunda. (Note: It replaced a building constructed in 1881 at 18-20 S. Nevada housed the mayor's office, city offices and the police and fire facilities. The simple building was not considered a good representation of the city, it was quoted in a publication in 1902 that "since the founding of the city, both the municipal and county offices have been housed in cheap, ramshackle buildings, entirely incommensurate to the dignity and standing of Colorado Springs and El Paso County.")

Originally, the building held the mayor's office, city council chambers and city agencies, some of which are the police department, water department and offices for the city clerk, auditor, treasurer, attorney, health physicians, and engineer. The police department moved out of the building in 1963. In 1980 city legislative and administrative offices were moved to 30 N. Nevada; Municipal courtrooms remained in the building. In 1997 the courtrooms moved to the Robert M. Isaac Municipal Court Building. The building remained vacant for a couple of years.

The City Hall was renovated between 1999 and 2000. The City Hall reopened in November 2001 and the mayor's office, city council, budget office, public communication office and city manager office moved into City Hall.

During the 1999-2000 renovation, the Statue of Liberty, which had sat on the front lawn, was removed. It was returned on May 12, 2011.

In 2011, the mayor's position became full-time and assumed the responsibilities of the City Manager. The City Manager's position was eliminated. Rather than an Assistant City Manager, the mayor has a full-time Chief of Staff.

== City government ==
=== City council ===
City council meetings are held in the Council Chambers on the 2nd and 4th Tuesdays of the month. Working sessions are held the Monday prior to the City Council meetings. The meetings may be viewed on the Internet using SpringsTV Newscast.

=== Downtown Review Board ===
The Downtown Review Board meets at City Hall.

== See also ==
- List of mayors of Colorado Springs, Colorado
- History of Colorado Springs, Colorado
