= Stratton's Independence Mine and Mill =

- U.S. National Register of Historic Places
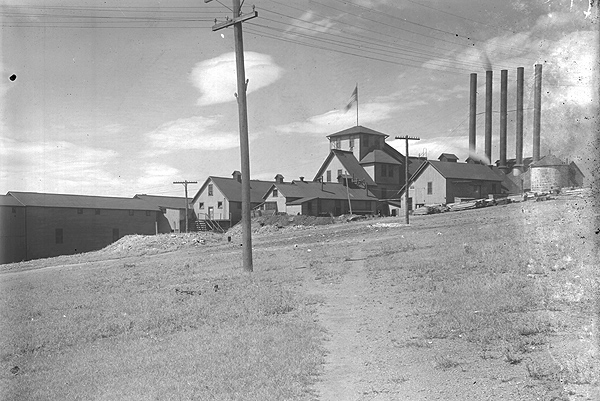
- Image from the George H. Stone Collection of Colorado geological features and views, Special Collections, Tutt Library, Colorado College.
- Location: Junction of Rangeview Road and State Highway 67, Teller County, Colorado
- Nearest city: Victor, Colorado
- Coordinates: 38°42′46″N 105°08′08″W
- Built: 1891
- NRHP reference No.: 93000054
- Added to NRHP: 1993-03-04

Stratton's Independence Mine and Mill is a historic gold mining site near Victor, Colorado on the south slope of Battle Mountain. Between late 1893 and April 1899, approximately 200,000 ounces (6200 kg) of gold was removed from the Independence Mine.

== History ==
In the spring of 1891 W. S. Stratton persuaded Leslie Popejoy to grubstake him in the Cripple Creek District in return for half the profits. Stratton staked two claims on the south slope of Battle Mountain on July 4, 1891. He called the two claims the Independence and the Washington in honor of the holiday. Stratton quickly sold his house and two lots, one in Denver and one in Colorado Springs, so that he could buy out Popejoy's share. His reason: some assays from the Independence lode showed a value of $380 per ton gold.

One boulder from the Independence mine brought $60,000, which Stratton used to sink a chute. In doing so he tapped directly into a rich vein.

The next year, in 1892, Stratton also hit gold in the Washington mine.

Stratton became the Cripple Creek District's first millionaire.

When Cripple Creek miners went on strike in 1894, Stratton's Independence mine and the Portland mine came to an agreement with them, against the wishes of other mine owners.

Stratton had incorporated the Portland company and was its first president and largest stockholder.

Stratton developed a theory that the gold veins in the Cripple Creek District converged at a great depth, roughly in the shape of a goblet. This theory did not pan out, however.

The mining companies became concerned about ore theft, and in 1897 they began hiring the services of Pinkerton agents.

In 1900 Stratton sold the Independence mine to the Venture Corporation of London for $10 million. The Venture Corporation incorporated the property as Stratton's Independence Ltd and sold shares on the London stock exchange. The ore reserves were discovered to be less than previously thought in late 1900, and the share price crashed. Venture Corporation sued Stratton, claiming that the mine had been salted. Stratton died in 1902, but his estate defeated the lawsuit.

In May 1900, two Western Federation of Miners (WFM) union representatives checked for union membership cards at the Independence mine. Approximately a hundred miners belonged to the union, and six or eight did not. One of the union representatives talked to the miners, who echoed the union rep's view that they would prefer not to work alongside non-union workers. Mine Superintendent Summers talked the non-union men into joining the union in order to promote harmony in the workforce.

In September 1900, the Independence mine was the first mine in the district to introduce a new stripping order requiring all underground workers to undress in one room of a change house and walk into another room in the nude while a guard observed. This was to take place at start and end of each shift. The new rule was implemented to prevent high grading (theft of gold ore) by the mine workers.

Five hundred miners met at Victor's Armory Hall, and they decided that while they would help stop ore thieves, they refused to work under the stripping rule. A compromise was reached which allowed the miners to strip to their undergarments. But the miners were unhappy. After the new practice was in place for about a month, a Pinkerton searched the miners at the end of a shift. No ore was found, and the miners walked out.

Three days later, Independence mine manager A.H. Shipman met with the WFM Executive Board. He ultimately agreed to abolish the Pinkerton guard system, to appoint a guard for the change rooms from candidates the union proposed, and to accept a closed shop. Under the agreement, any miner suspected of high-grading could be searched by a fellow union member in the presence of a watchman. Shipman also announced that he would support membership in the WFM by miners in return for the union's help in stopping the practice of high grading.

In 1902 the miners at the Independence mine bought diamond rings for Shipman, who had negotiated the closed shop, for Superintendent Sam Lobb, and for Assistant Manager R.J. Grant. The miners and the managers enjoyed a "little smoking session" at Shipman's home after the presentation.

=== Colorado Labor Wars ===
In 1903 there was a major strike by the Western Federation of Miners. Many miners throughout the Cripple Creek District walked out of any mines that were shipping ore to the mills at Colorado City, in order to support a strike by the mill workers there.

==== Cage mishap kills fifteen ====
On the night of January 26, 1904, non-union replacement workers were coming off shift in the Independence Mine when the cage that they were riding in had a serious mishap. The cage was drawn into the sheave wheel at the top of the shaft. The cable that supported the cage was severed, and the cage fell. Fifteen miners fell into the shaft, 1500 feet deep.

The investigation focused on safety arrangements, and the qualifications of the hoisting engineer. One miner, James Bullock, survived the accident. His testimony to the coroner's jury describes the disaster:

... We kept going right along but it kept slipping; we would go a little ways and then we would slip again; then he took us about six feet above the collar of the shaft, then he lowered us back down.

Q. Did he stop six feet above the shaft?

A. He stopped just for a second or two; then he lowered us and it must have gotten beyond his control, for we dropped about sixty or seventy feet, we were going pretty. [sic] We said to each other we are all gone. Then he raised us up about ten feet; then he stopped us and it slipped back again, and we went to the sheave wheel as fast as we could go. When I was going up there, I began to crouch to save myself from the hard blow. I seen a piece of timber about one foot wide, and I grabbed hold and held myself up there and pretty soon the cage dropped and I began to holler for a ladder to get down.

The hoisting engineer's testimony is also quite descriptive of the incident:

I tried several times, but that time the cage was at the collar of the shaft. I immediately reversed the engine and sent the cage back 100 feet. I again tried the brakes, reversed the engine, and brought the cage back to the surface. The brake was still stuck; I could not move it. I again reversed the engine and sent the cage back about the same distance and stepped over to the other side and took hold of the other brake, and it was in the same condition. The second time the cage came to the surface, I called three times for the shift boss, for God's sake come and help me put on the brakes. In the meantime, I was reversing the engine backwards and forwards. Mr. MacDonald came and two other men with him. I said come up and help me put on the brakes, and then I discovered the hood of the cage above the collar of the shaft. I immediately reversed the engine, but it was too late.

The coroner's jury found the brakes had been inspected six hours before the accident, and the brakes were working after the accident. The coroner's jury questioned another hoisting engineer from the Stratton Mine about the qualifications of the engineer operating the hoist. They learned that "the employer had taken the man's word – nothing more – as to his qualifications. The engineer involved in the fatal accident, however, had been recommended by a former employer."

The coroner's report stated that the engineer had lost control because of management's negligence, having failed to properly install a safety device to prevent overwinding. Also, the [backup braking system consisting of] disk brakes on the hoisting engine had been detached.

The Western Federation of Miners echoed the coroner's charge of mismanagement. Although the property was at that time guarded by soldiers and enclosed by the main militia encampment, providing no access to union members, management accused the union of tampering with the machinery.

One hundred and sixty-eight non-union men reportedly quit the Independence Mine because of the incident.

Just a few months later, after several violent incidents occurred in the district, the WFM was driven out by force of arms in a struggle that came to be called the Colorado Labor Wars.

== Geology ==
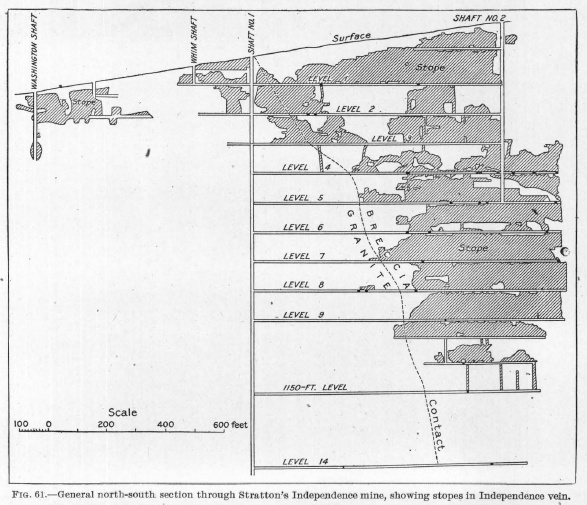
North-south section showing stopes in the Independence vein.

The Washington claim is within granite, while the Independence is within a breccia, which was a better gold producer. The Independence shaft reached 70 feet by 1894 and was producing 800 tons of ore per month, with 3.5 ounces of gold per ton. In 1895, the shaft reached 300 feet, and was producing 90 tons per month. The shaft was down to 900 feet by 1897 when Venture Corporation Ltd. purchased the property. Phonolite dikes permeate both the granite and the breccia. "In many places ore occurs in phonolite dikes, nearly always as calaverite in very narrow fissures associated with fluorite and quartz as gangue".

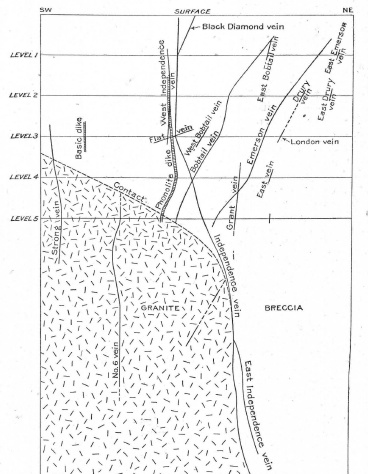
Section showing the relationship of the mine levels, the veins, granite and breccia.

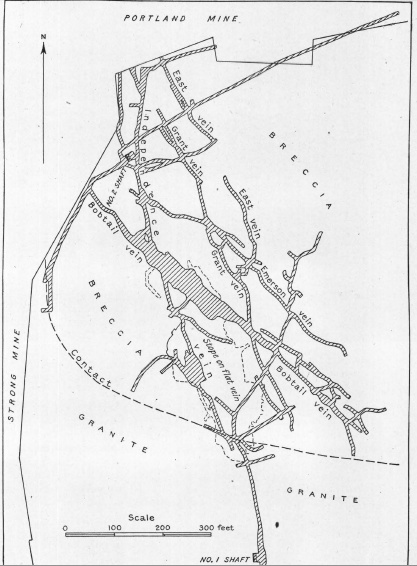
Level 4 vein map

== See also ==
- Gold mining in Colorado
- National Register of Historic Places listings in Teller County, Colorado
