= Floyd K. Lindstrom =

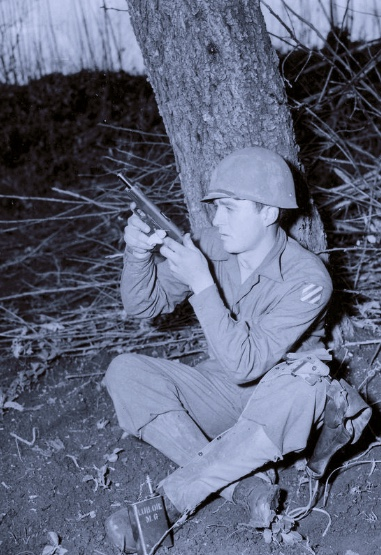
- Floyd K. Lindstrom, November 11, 1943, U.S. Army
- Born: June 21, 1912; Holdrege, Nebraska
- Died: February 3, 1944 (aged 31); Anzio, Italy
- Burial place: Evergreen Cemetery, Colorado Springs, Colorado
- Military career
- Allegiance: United States of America
- Branch: United States Army
- Service years: 1942 - 1944
- Rank: Private First Class
- Units: 7th Infantry Regiment, 3rd Infantry Division
- Conflicts: World War II
- Awards: Medal of Honor, Silver Star, Purple Heart, Italian Military Crosses

Floyd Kenneth Lindstrom (June 21, 1912 – February 3, 1944) was a United States Army soldier and a recipient of the United States military's highest decoration—the Medal of Honor—for his actions in World War II.

== Early life ==
Born in Holdrege, Nebraska, on June 21, 1912, his parents were Anna (née Stongberg) and Otto Rudolph Lindstrom. (Note: His mother's dates of birth and death are April 27, 1885 and March 14, 1970. She was a beautician after working at the Myron Stratton Home. His father was born April 8, 1881 and died November 19, 1954. In 1910, Anna and 29-year-old Otto lived on their farm in Westmark, Nebraska, with their daughter Pauline and Anna’s brother Emil Stongberg. Both men were farmers.)

When Lindstrom was a toddler, his mother brought him and his older sister Pauline to Colorado. It is reported that Lindstrom never saw his father. Moving to Colorado Springs about 1914, Anna worked and lived in a cottage with her children at the Myron Stratton Home. Lindstrom was a Boy Scout who also earned his Eagle Scout from Boy Scout Troop 1 and graduated from Cheyenne Mountain High School in 1931.

After graduation, he moved to downtown Colorado Springs and worked as a soda jerk before working as a truck driver for Soomers Market, with his route between Colorado and California. He drove for eleven years, working for Associated Grocers when they took over the transportation business. His fiancé, who died in February 1942 of a heart attack, was Mary Jane Wackenhut. (Note: Mary Jane Wackenhut was buried at the Evergreen Cemetery on February 3, 1942.)

== World War II ==
Lindstrom joined the Army on June 22, 1942. He was at Camp Roberts, California, from July 17, 1942, to October 15, 1942. Lindstrom was then sent to the 3rd Infantry Division and was assigned to Company H, 2nd Battalion, 7th Infantry Regiment. He served first in North Africa.

While in convoy on July 12, 1943, in Sicily, his unit came under attack by four enemy planes. The convoy stopped and everyone dispersed. He saw one truck starting to roll. Seeing it was moving towards an unaware soldier lying in the road and "disregarding the strafing by the planes, [he] jumped on the truck’s running board and guided it away from the soldier and also prevented it going over a steep embankment." This action saved men and equipment. Lindstrom was awarded the Silver Star on August 19, 1943.

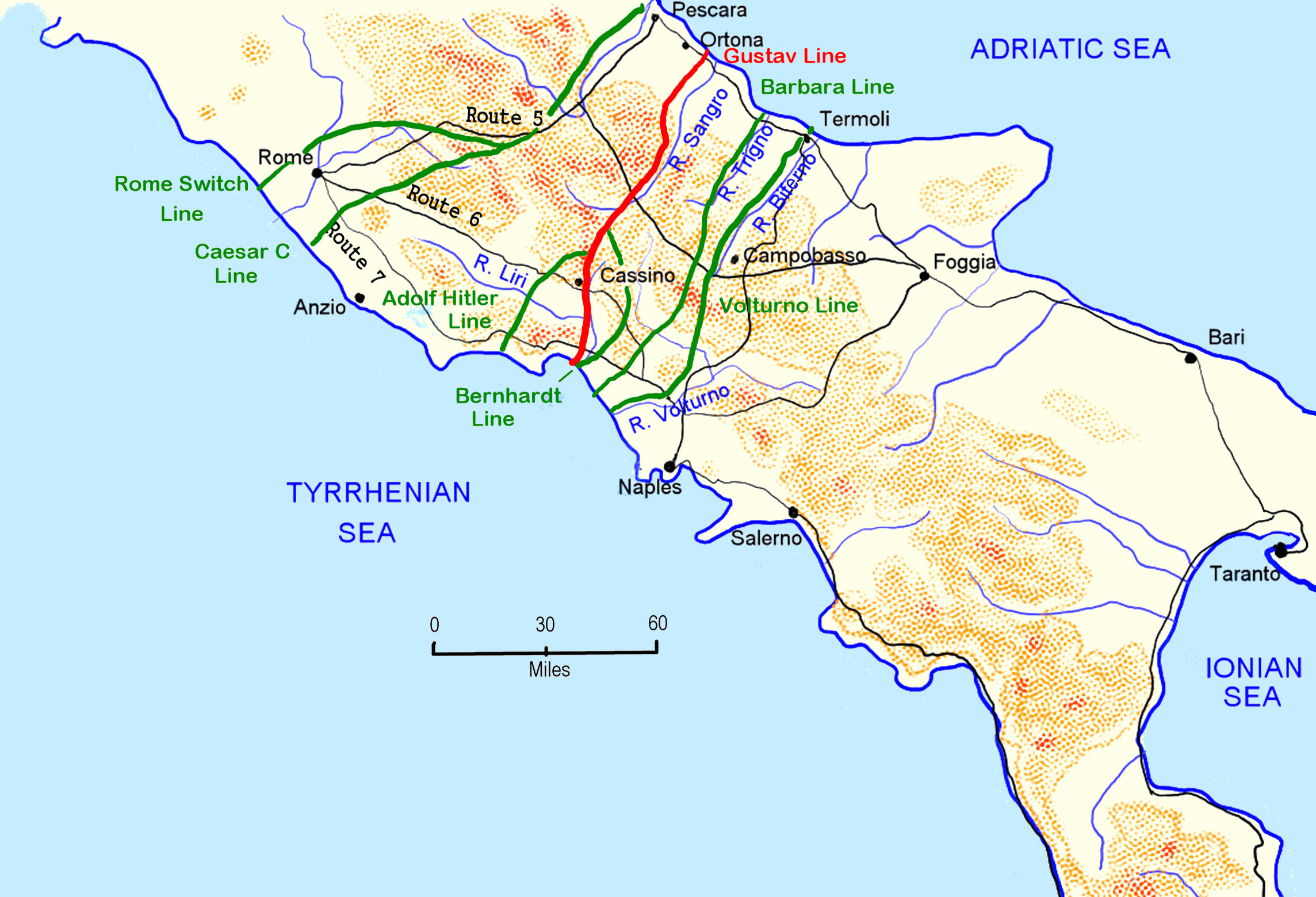
German prepared defensive lines south of Rome. Mount la Difensa was on Bernhardt Line

By November 11, 1943, (Note: The Medal of Honor and other documentation states that the date was November 11; but the Military History documentation of the event states it was November 5, 1943.) Lindstrom was serving as a private first class in the 3rd Infantry Division, attempting to climb the treacherous slopes of Mount la Difensa while under heavy gunfire from German soldiers. On that day, near Mignano, Italy, he single-handedly charged and captured a German machine gun, killed a soldier and sent the others in the nest scurrying for safety. He then began shooting German soldiers with the machine gun and risked his life to get more ammunition. He was nominated for the Medal of Honor. On January 22, 1944, he landed at an Anzio beachhead with his unit, although he had been offered duty away from the fighting, and on February 3, he was killed in a German counterattack. On April 20, 1944, was posthumously awarded the Medal of Honor. See also Battle for Monte la Difensa.

Initially, he was first listed as missing in action and on June 6, 1944, his status was changed to killed in action. First buried at Nettuno, Italy then four years later, in July 1948 he was returned to his family in Colorado Springs, where he is buried next to his mother in Evergreen Cemetery. His sister donated his medals and paperwork to the Pioneers Museum in downtown Colorado Springs. He was awarded the Purple Heart and two Italian Military Crosses.

== Medal of Honor citation ==
=== Medal of Honor citation ===
Private First Class Lindstrom's official Medal of Honor citation reads:

For conspicuous gallantry and intrepidity at risk of life above and beyond the call of duty. On 11 November 1943, this soldier's platoon was furnishing machinegun support for a rifle company attacking a hill near Mignano, Italy, when the enemy counterattacked, forcing the riflemen and half the machinegun platoon to retire to a defensive position. Pfc. Lindstrom saw that his small section was alone and outnumbered 5 to 1, yet he immediately deployed the few remaining men into position and opened fire with his single gun. The enemy centered fire on him with machinegun, machine pistols, and grenades. Unable to knock out the enemy nest from his original position, Pfc. Lindstrom picked up his own heavy machinegun and staggered 15 yards up the barren, rocky hillside to a new position, completely ignoring enemy small arms fire which was striking all around him. From this new site, only 10 yards from the enemy machinegun, he engaged it in an intense duel. Realizing that he could not hit the hostile gunners because they were behind a large rock, he charged uphill under a steady stream of fire, killed both gunners with his pistol and dragged their gun down to his own men, directing them to employ it against the enemy. Disregarding heavy rifle fire, he returned to the enemy machinegun nest for 2 boxes of ammunition, came back and resumed withering fire from his own gun. His spectacular performance completely broke up the German counterattack. Pfc. Lindstrom demonstrated aggressive spirit and complete fearlessness in the face of almost certain death.

== Awards and decorations ==

Badge	Combat Infantryman Badge		
1st row	Medal of Honor		Silver Star
2nd row	Bronze Star Medal	Purple Heart	Army Good Conduct Medal
3rd row	American Campaign Medal	European–African–Middle Eastern Campaign Medal with one campaign star	World War II Victory Medal

Foreign awards

Italian Military Cross

== Legacy ==
- By a public law dated December 16, 2014, the Department of Veterans Affairs community-based outpatient clinic in Colorado Springs was named the PFC Floyd K. Lindstrom Department of Veterans Affairs Clinic by the 113th United States Congress.
- He was made a Colorado Freedom Memorial Honoree by 2001. The memorial is a Springhill Community Park, Aurora, Colorado.
- Lindstrom Street on Fort Carson in Colorado Springs is named for him.
- The American Legion Post 5 flagpole in Colorado Springs is dedicated to Lindstrom.
- There are plaques to honor him at The Shrine of Remembrance in the Veterans Honor Court in Colorado Springs and the city park in Cripple Creek, Colorado.
- On June 20, 2019, Colorado Springs American Legion Post 5 voted to rename the post to American Legion PFC FLOYD K LINDSTROM POST 5.

== See also ==
- List of Medal of Honor recipients

== Notes ==
d c note is mistaken the reports that it was the 5 Nov. in section 99 it clearly states it was the 11 Nov. Or ii Nov in the section.
