= Colorado Springs Public Library–Carnegie Building =

- U.S. National Register of Historic Places
- Colorado State Register of Historic Properties No. 5EP.646
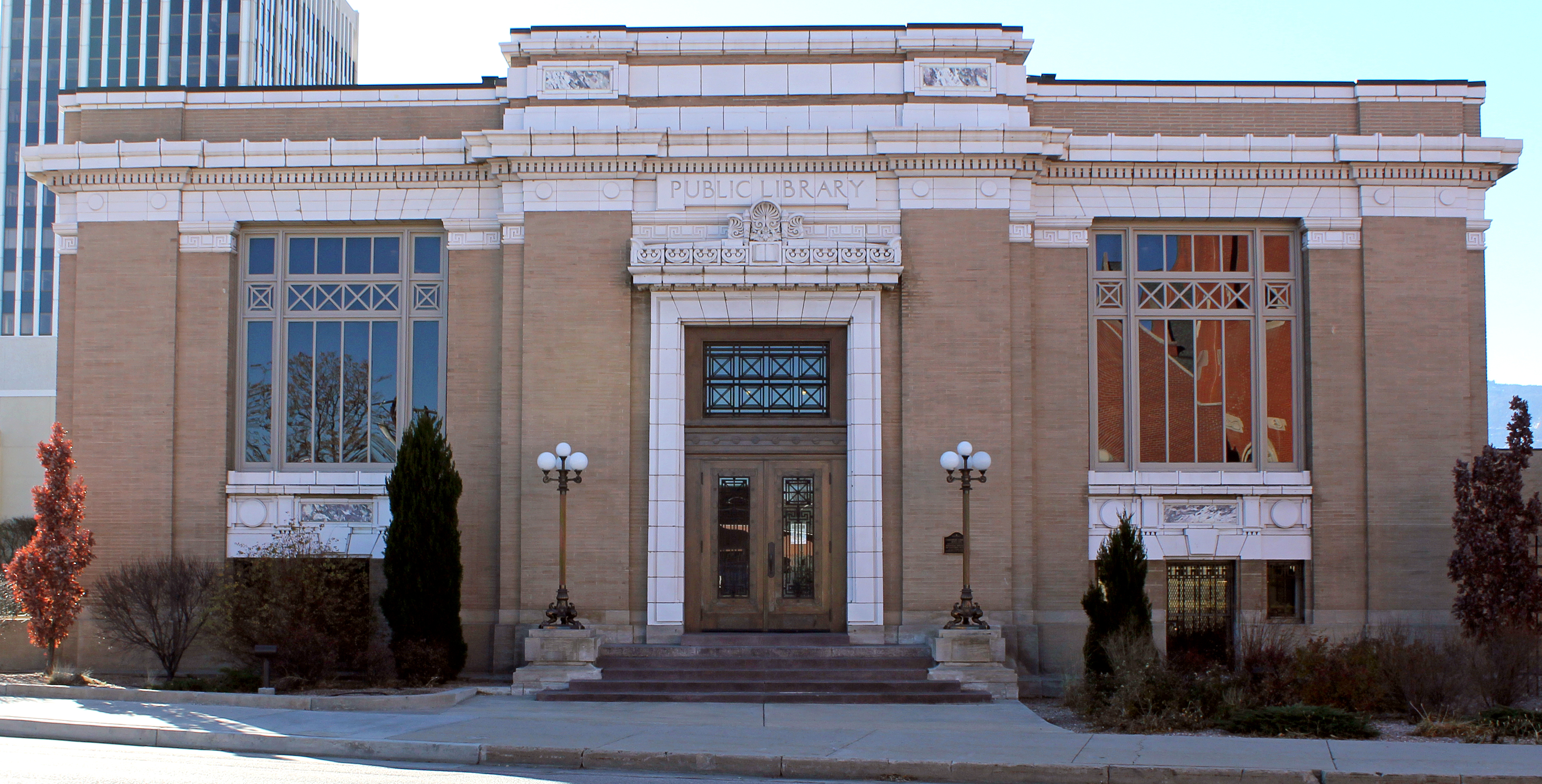

- Location within Colorado Location within the United States
- Location: 21 W. Kiowa Street, Colorado Springs, Colorado
- Coordinates: 38°50′8.37″N 104°49′34.92″W
- Built: 1905
- Architect: Calvin Kiessling
- Architectural style: Neo-classical
- NRHP reference No.: 96001238
- CSRHP No.: 5EP.646

Significant dates
- Added to NRHP: November 1, 1996
- Designated CSRHP: November 1, 1996

The Colorado Springs Public Library–Carnegie Building is a Neo-classical library building in Colorado Springs, Colorado. Funded by the Andrew Carnegie Library Fund. The building is on the National Register of Historic Places. It is associated with the City Beautiful movement.

== History ==
Andrew Carnegie donated $60,000 for the construction of the library. One side of the library is semi-circular with a continuous ornamental balcony and a view of Pikes Peak and the Rocky Mountains. The building is made of granite, gray Tennessee marble, Breche Violette marble, sandstone and Roman-shaped gray hydraulic press brick. Inside the library the building had reading rooms, space for 17,000 volumes, an auditorium, and a reference room. Calvin Kiessling, the architect for the building, said "the building lends itself to all the requirements of modern library purposes and affords its patrons the unrestricted enjoyment of the beauties of the distant mountains and immediate surrounding."

The Penrose Library was built in 1967 as an addition to the library. The Carnegie Library has a "cherished" collection on the city's history.

== Collections ==
The Carnegie building holds genealogy and regional history collections, which include books, archives, manuscripts, photographs, periodical and maps. Besides print materials, the library has access to genealogical databases and is a FamilySearch affiliate library.

== Demonstration garden ==
A demonstration garden was opened in 2007 alongside the library. It was created by a master gardener, library staff, and volunteers, to provide a retreat within the city and a place to learn about plants selected for the local climate. The garden area has sculptures made by local artists, benches, stone walls, and a stage.

== See also ==
- History of Colorado Springs, Colorado
