= Dorolyn Lines =

American irrigation engineer (1901–1975)

- Born: December 20, 1901; Sylvan Grove, Kansas, U.S.
- Died: October 13, 1975 (aged 73); Colorado Springs, Colorado, U.S.
- Education: University of Kansas (BSME, 1923)
- Occupation: Mechanical engineer
- Employer: Hassell Iron Works
- Known for: First woman graduate of University of Kansas School of Engineering
- Awards: Society of Women Engineers (SWE) Scholarship Namesake

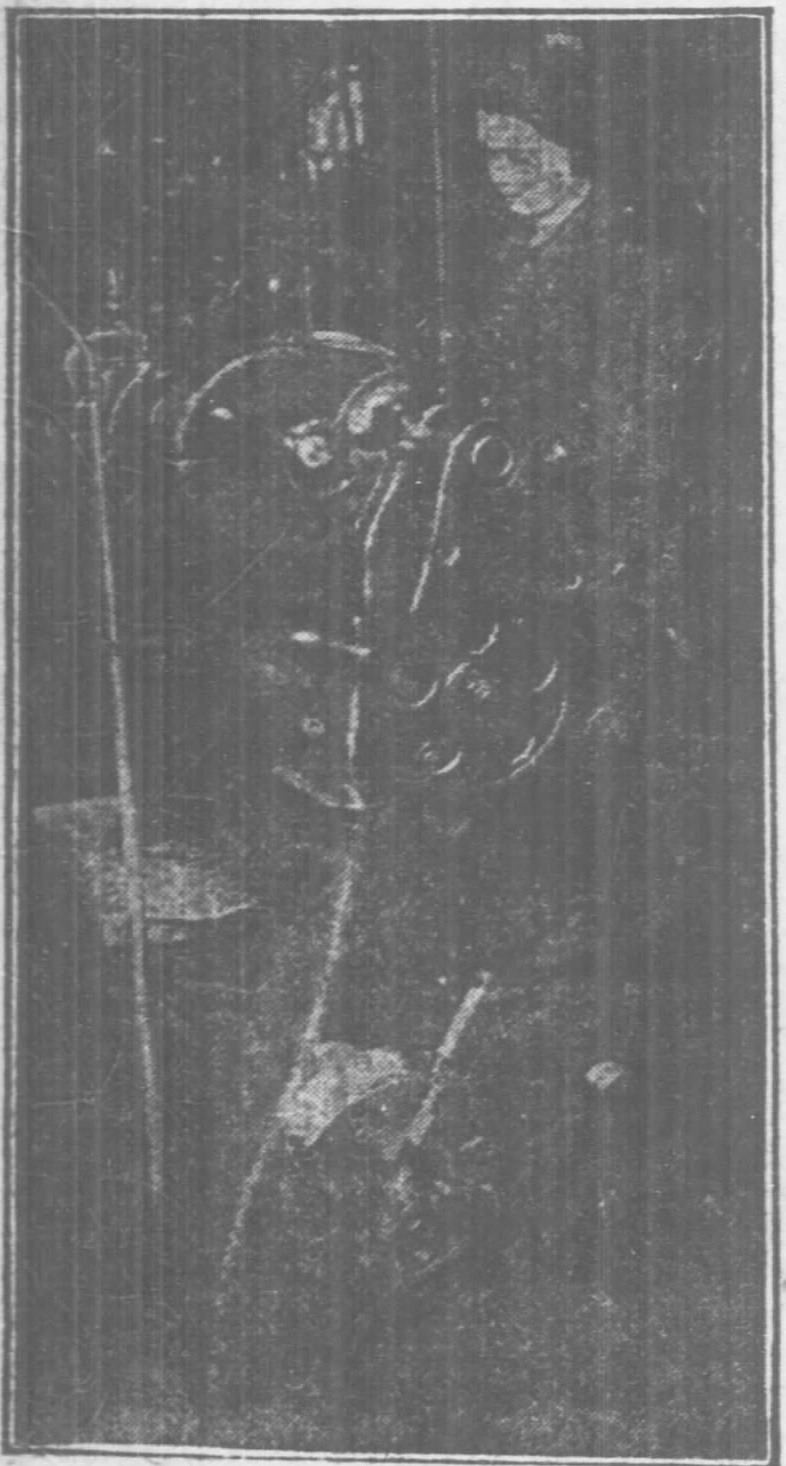
Dorolyn Lines, image from the Topeka Daily Capital

Dorolyn Lines (née Boyd; October 24, 1901 – January 17, 1975) was an American engineer known for her design of canal and irrigation systems in California, Yuma, the Missouri River basin, the Columbia River basin, the Lower Rio Grande, and Oregon. She was honored with a Certificate of Merit from the Bureau of Reclamation in 1966, and was remembered for her work in raising the status of women engineers.

== Early life and family ==
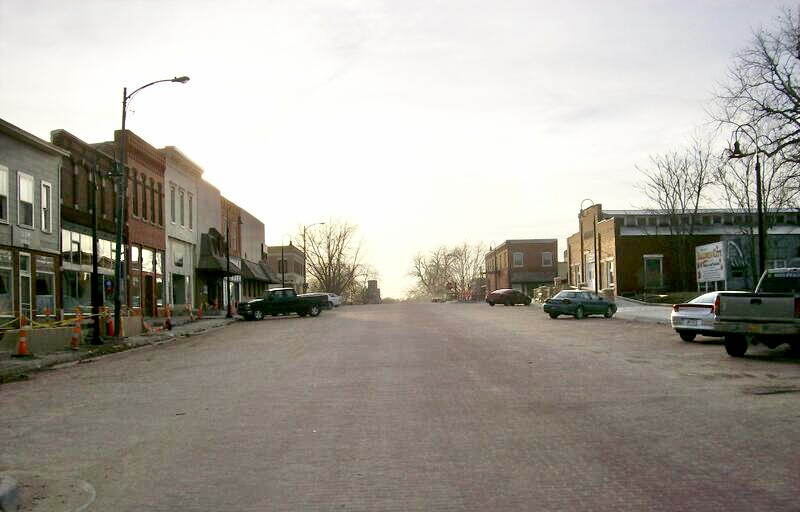
Downtown Baldwin City, Kansas

Dorolyn (née Boyd) Lines was born in Baldwin, Kansas, but moved to Colorado as a child. Her family consisted of her parents, Jenny S. and George A. Boyd, as well as three sisters. She was the youngest member of the family. After completing college, Lines married an engineering classmate, Marion Brown Lines, on June 10, 1924. The Lines family would live at 1500 South Cascade Ave, in Colorado Springs, a house built in 1909. However, by 1925 they had moved to 1235 S. Washington St. in Denver. Marion would later die by an accident on April 11, 1934. He was buried Evergreen Cemetery in Colorado Springs. Lines had three daughters.

== Education ==
After attending local public schools in Colorado, Lines attended the University of Kansas School of Engineering, where she graduated with a Bachelor of Science in mechanical engineering in 1923. She also served as an instructor at the school for one year, but declined an associate professorship when she decided to get married.

Regarding her college career at University of Kansas, on January 2, 1921, Lines was mentioned in a published news article in the Topeka Daily Capital under the heading, "Women Are Pre-Empting All Educational Fields: Law, Medicine, Even Machinery Attract Fair Students.":

This year fourteen women are enrolled in the school of engineering. One woman, Dorolyn Boyd, sophomore from Colorado Springs, is taking mechanical engineering.

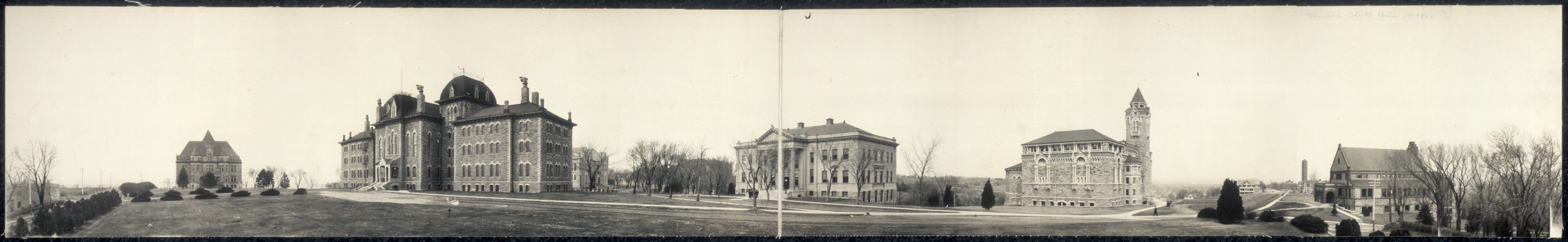
Panorama of the University of Kansas campus in the early 1900s.

== Career ==
Following the death of her husband, Lines took a position as a canals and irrigation engineer in the Canals Branch of Designs and Structures, U.S. Bureau of Reclamation. Lines remained in this position from 1934 until her retirement in 1966. According to a report in The Western Engineer, in 1960 she visited her daughter in Florida and witnessed the shooting of the second astronaut into space, Gus Grissom., and attended the 10th Annual Convention of the Society of Women Engineers in Seattle, Washington. Her final major engineering design project consisted of plans for an irrigation system for 96,000 acres near Pendleton, Oregon.

== Advocacy for women in engineering ==
Lines served as Recording Secretary and Treasurer of the Society of Women Engineers Denver Section during 1955–56.

In preserved correspondence from 1958 with the Employment Committee Chair for the Society of Women Engineers, Ruth L. Shafer, Lines strongly advocated for female chemical engineering students who were being rejected from employment opportunities in engineering as they were deemed to be "too dangerous." She stated that:

We are not so much asking you to find a job for these girls, but trying to learn if you know of any chemical engineering work where women may be employed without bias. We can understand that some types of chemical equipment is dangerous, and that it would difficult for a woman to supervise or inspect work around such equipment. But surely it is such a broad field that there are points of entry for women.

— Dorolyn Lines, March 9, 1958).

== Legacy ==
The Society of Women Engineers Rocky Mountain Section awards a scholarship named in Lines' honor called the Dorolyn Lines Scholarship. Lines was a charter member of the Rocky Mountain (Denver) Section.

The Denver Public Library archive maintains the "Society of Women Engineers, Denver Section: Ladies Brunch Photograph Collection," which contains an image of Lines from February 1956.

Lines is buried in Evergreen Cemetery, in Colorado Springs, Colorado.

== Dorolyn Lines Scholarship ==
To honor her legacy as a trailblazer for women in heavy industry, the Society of Women Engineers (SWE) Rocky Mountain Section established the Dorolyn Lines Scholarship in 1990. The scholarship is awarded annually to collegiate women who have demonstrated engineering achievement and leadership, specifically targeting rising juniors and seniors at ABET-accredited universities in Colorado and Wyoming.

=== Recent Recipients ===
The scholarship continues to be awarded annually to students who embody Lines' technical excellence.

Year	Recipient	Institution	Academic Focus
2024	Jessica Tomshack	Colorado School of Mines	Mechanical Engineering
2023	Madelyn Schmidt	University of Colorado Boulder	Mechanical Engineering
2022	Jessica Woodard	University of Colorado Boulder	MS in Mechanical Engineering
2021	Mia Miller	University of Colorado Boulder	Mechanical Engineering
2020	Leila J. G. Smith	University of Wyoming	Mechanical Engineering
