= Alamo Hotel =

Historic building in Colorado, US

- U.S. National Register of Historic Places
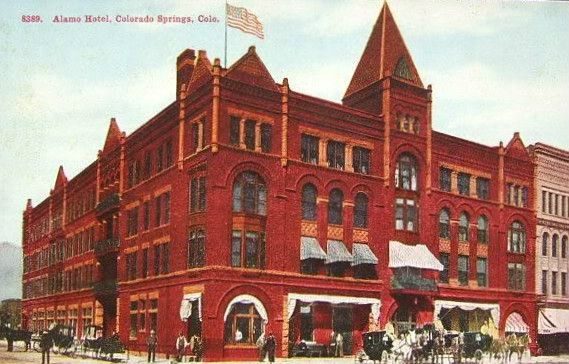
- The Alamo Hotel (picture dated between 1907 and 1923)

- Location within Colorado Springs, Colorado Location within Colorado Location within the United States
- Location: 128 S. Tejon ST., Colorado Springs, Colorado
- Built: 1886
- Architect: J.P. Barber
- Architectural style: Federal
- NRHP reference No.: 77000373
- Added to NRHP: 9/14/1977

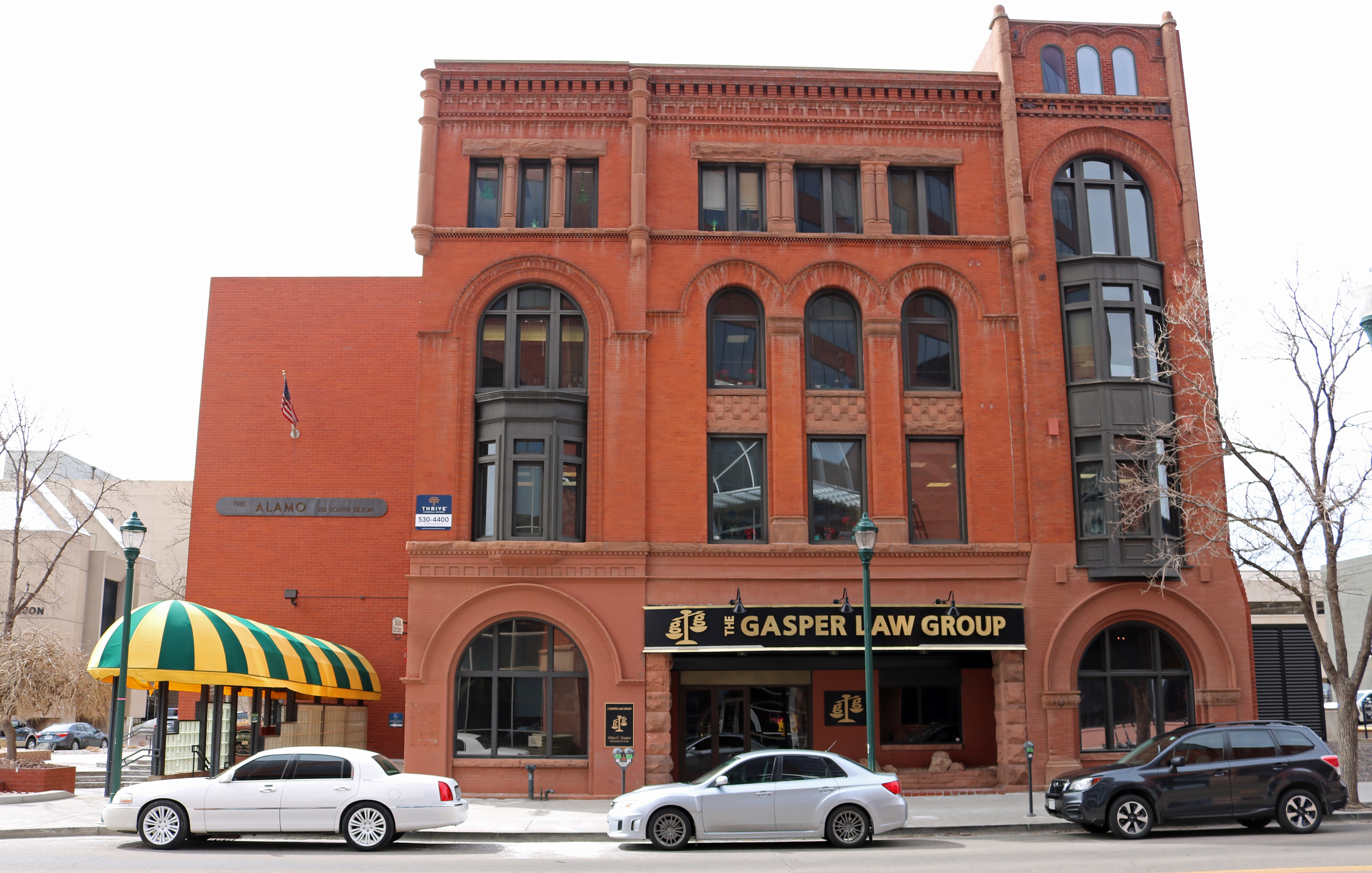
The property's front façade in 2022

The Alamo Hotel is a building in Colorado Springs, Colorado, United States, which is listed on the National Register of Historic Places. The hotel was constructed in 1886 and then renovated in 1890 and 1899, and served as a traveling stop for ordinary travelers and salesmen. The hotel was converted to apartments in 1968 and is now used to house shops in addition to apartments. The property was listed in 1977.

Sometime after the Colorado Springs Urban Renewal Authority purchased the property in 1974, it was renovated, and several portions of the structure were completely removed, leaving only the south portion and the north tower.

MacKenzie’s Chop House opened inside of this hotel in 1997.

== See also ==
- National Register of Historic Places listings in El Paso County, Colorado
