= Rock Ledge Ranch Historic Site =

- Chambers Ranch
- U.S. National Register of Historic Places
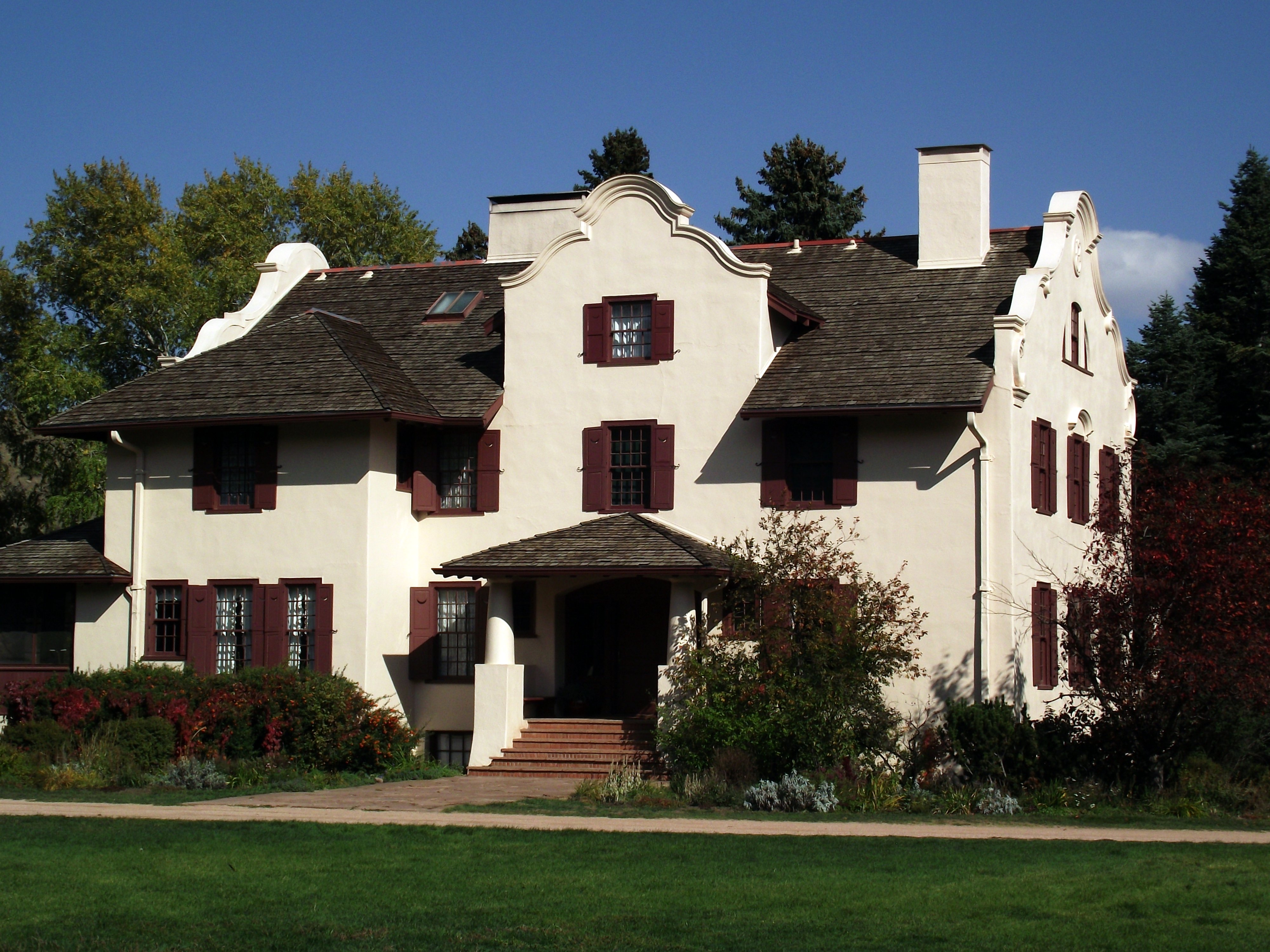

- Location within Colorado Location within the United States
- Location: 3105 Gateway Road, Colorado Springs, Colorado
- Coordinates: 38°52′38.61″N 104°52′17.08″W
- Area: 226 acres (0.91 km^{2})
- Built: 1875
- Architect: Robert Chambers, Thomas MacLaren
- Architectural style: Mission/Spanish Revival, Other, Western Stick
- Website: https://rockledgeranch.com
- NRHP reference No.: 79000599
- Added to NRHP: November 29, 1979

Rock Ledge Ranch Historic Site is a living history museum (sometimes called an open-air museum) and farm located at Garden of the Gods in Colorado Springs, Colorado, United States. Staff and volunteers dressed in period-appropriate attire interpret life in the Pikes Peak region from 1775 through 1910. Rock Ledge Ranch is home to six historic sites: an American Indian Area interpreting indigenous life from 1775 through 1835; an 1860s homestead cabin; an 1880s homestead garden; the 1874 Rock Ledge House; an 1890s blacksmith shop; and a 1907 Edwardian Country Estate. Rock Ledge Ranch Historic Site is listed on the National Register of Historic Places.

== Museum ==
Museum guides, each wearing clothing specific to the time period and type of residence, explain and demonstrate activities of daily life of those who lived in the region. Visitors see and participate to learn how people from different time periods lived during the eras: clothing, meal prep and cooking, cleaning, laundry, mowing, games and entertainment, and how they made their living.

There is a working 19th Century blacksmith shop, barn, horses, and chickens. Sheep and a cow graze around the farm. At one time, peacocks were resident. The historical interpreters demonstrate daily living skills, and encourage visitors to participate. The museum hosts over 100,000 people on an annual basis.

Because of the City of Colorado Springs' economic difficulties in 2009, its funding and continued existence was threatened. However, an aggressive fundraising campaign has generated huge public support as well as additional opportunities to experience this setting due to themed special events such as Fiddles, Vittles, and Vino and a Shakespeare festival.

In 2023, the cost of admissions was US$8 for adults, US$4 for ages 3 to 17.
