= Winfield Scott Stratton =

American prospector and philanthropist from Colorado

- Stratton, 1901
- Born: July 22, 1848; Jeffersonville, Indiana, US
- Died: September 14, 1902 (aged 54); Colorado Springs, Colorado, US
- Occupations: Prospector, philanthropist
- Known for: First millionaire from the Cripple Creek Mining District boom
- Spouse: Zeurah Stewart (divorced)
- Relatives: 1

Winfield Scott Stratton (July 22, 1848 – September 14, 1902) was an American prospector, capitalist, and philanthropist. He discovered the Independence Lode near Victor, Colorado on July 4, 1891, and became the Cripple Creek Mining District's first millionaire in 1894. He provided to build buildings, improve the street car system, build the first professional ball park, and provided funds to people in need.

== Early life ==
Stratton was born on July 22, 1848, in Jeffersonville, Indiana. His parents name's were Mary and Myron Stratton. Stratton is a descendant from the Windsor, Connecticut line of the Stratton family. Stratton's mother had twelve children; of four boys, he is said to be the only one who lived beyond childhood. Stratton was the only male child at that time.

== Education ==
Stratton learned carpentry in his father's shipyards. After he moved to Colorado, he studied geology at Colorado College and studied metallurgy at the Colorado School of Mines in 1874.

== Career ==
In August 1872, Stratton worked as a carpenter for $3 a day in Colorado Springs, Colorado area. Stratton joined the Carpenter's Union, and built furniture and homes during the winter, including working on the house of Helen Hunt Jackson and the McAllister House.

In 1874, he began prospecting for gold and silver in the summers. He was unsuccessful in San Juan County, Colorado, but he started prospecting in the Cripple Creek Mining District and located the Martha Washington mine, which he sold for $80,000.

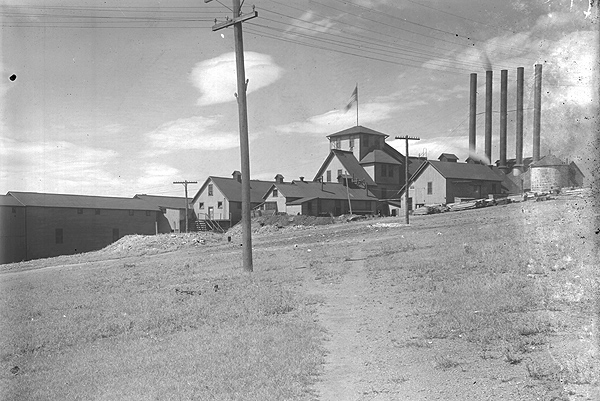
Stratton's Independence Mine and Mill

Stratton filed a claim for the Independence mine in Cripple Creek, Colorado on July 4, 1891. He used the money from the sale of the Martha Washington mine to work the Independence Mine. He found a gold vein close to the surface worth $3 million in 1893. He earned an average of $1 million each year until 1899, which made him the first millionaire of the Cripple Creek Gold Rush.

In 1899, Stratton sold Independence mine for $11 million.

Stratton also had an interest in the Portland mine. Stratton invested in real estate in Denver, Colorado.

== Philanthropy ==
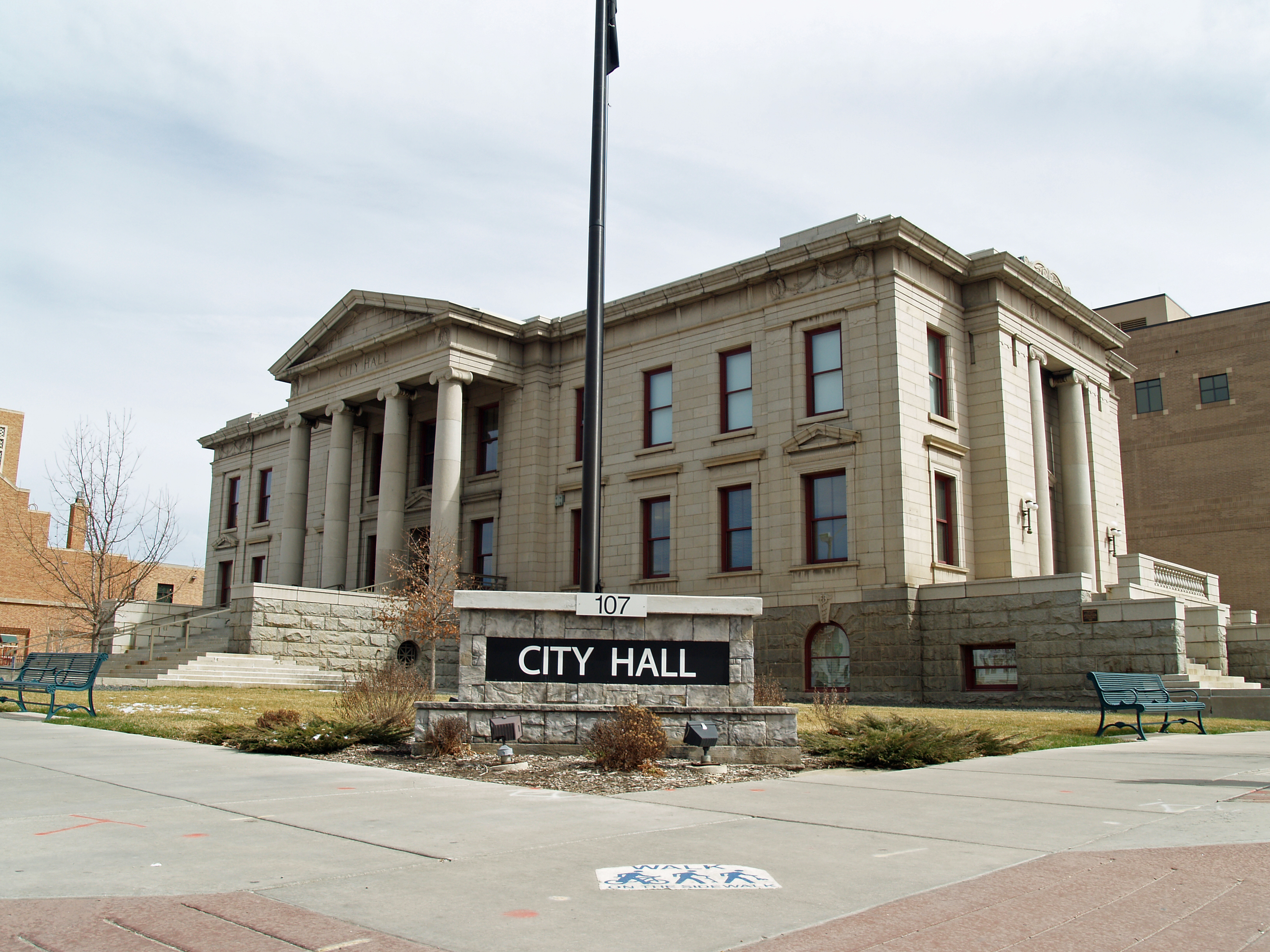
Colorado Springs City Hall

He provided the land to build the Colorado Springs City Hall, Mining Exchange building, and Post Office and Federal Courthouse in Colorado Springs. He donated the money for the construction of the El Paso County Courthouse, which is now the Pioneer Museum. He paid for the construction of the Independence Building, where he had an office.

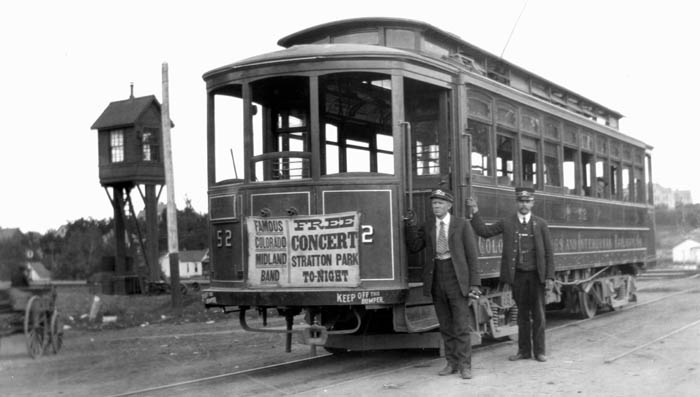
Colorado Springs and Interurban Railway car, 1907 or 1908

He bought the streetcar system that became the Colorado Springs and Interurban Railway and spent $2 million improving it so that it had 36 miles of tracks and 56 cars. The line ended in the southwest park of Colorado Springs at Stratton Park, which Stratton donated to the city. The Colorado Springs and Interurban Railway became one of the best streetcar systems in the country.

The Colorado Springs Millionaires played at the city's first professional baseball stadium, which was built by Stratton. It was located at the corner of Cheyenne Boulevard and South Tejon. He donated the money in his estate for the Myron Stratton Home.

Mr. Stratton had done for this city and the Cripple Creek district very much what Mr. Tabor had earlier done for Denver. His wise and public-spirited use of the money have entitled him to a place in the public remembrance which will endure for many years.

— Obituary for Stratton, The Evening Telegraph, Colorado Springs, September 15, 1902

He gave money to prospectors or others in need and he paid for schooling for a teen who was a talented violinist and provided all the laundresses in the town with bicycles. After the Cripple Creek fire of 1896, Stratton paid for food and shelter for many left homeless by the fire. He is said to have written a check for $5,000 to "Crazy Bob" Womack, the prospector who first discovered gold at Cripple, but was down on his luck. He gave $20,000 to Horace A. W. Tabor when Tabor was broke.

== Personal life ==
Stratton lived a simple life in a wooden house on Weber Street after he became wealthy. He did not seem to have long-lasting relationships with women until he had a short marriage with Zeurah Stewart. She became pregnant before their marriage in 1876. Stratton did not believe that the baby was his child and was often angry and jealous. She returned to her family and the marriage ended. He had a housekeeper for many years named Eliza, with whom he could be brusque. She was called the "suffering but faithful housekeeper Eliza" in the Gold Rushes and Mining Camps of the Early American West book. He became reclusive and eccentric. He drank and read a great deal, but rarely had guests or went out socially.

Stratton was fond of a quote by William Henry Channing, 19th-century religious thinker and part of the Transcendental movement:

To live content with small means, to seek elegance rather than
luxury, and refinement rather than fashion; to be worthy, not
respectable, to study hard, think quietly, talk gently, act frankly;
to listen to stars and birds, to babes and sages, with open heart;
to bear all cheerfully, do all bravely, await occasions, hurry
never; in a word, to let the spiritual, unbidden and unconscious,
grow up through the common. This is to be my symphony.

Stratton lived at 115 N. Weber St. in Colorado Springs. He had failing health due to cirrhosis of the liver and diabetes. By the time he was 43, he was tall, thin and frail with silky white hair. His personal physician Dr. D.H. Rice traveled with him on long journeys because of his poor health. He died at his home on September 14, 1902, at 54 years of age. His body was visited by more than 8,600 people at the Mining Exchange Building the day before he was buried in southeastern Colorado Springs at Evergreen Cemetery.

When he died, most of his estate went towards the creation and maintenance of the Myron Stratton Home. He did, though leave $50,000 each to his son, Harry Stratton of Toulon, Illinois and other relatives. (Note: There were conditions for the bequest to his son. If he contests the will, he gets nothing. If he dies, his heirs get nothing. He would not get the money until he signed a waiver that he would not contest the will.)

== Legacy ==
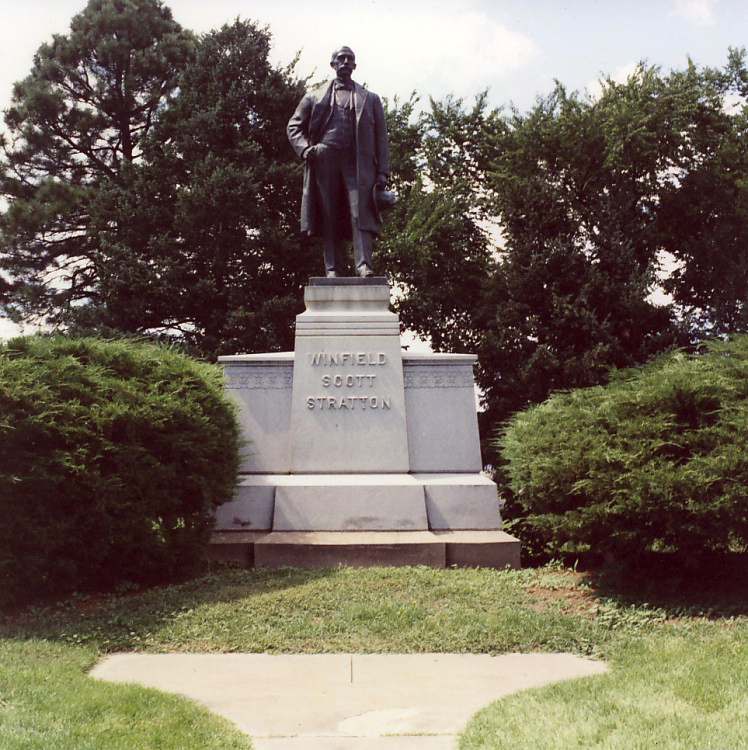
Winfield Scott Stratton Monument by Nellie Walker

Stratton left the bulk of his estate for the establishment of the Myron Stratton Home, for "the aged poor and dependent children." It is named for his father Myron Stratton.

A bronze statue of Stratton by Nellie Walker was placed on the grounds of his estate in 1909. (Note: The sculptor of the work ended up living at the Myron Stratton Home for the last years of her life.)

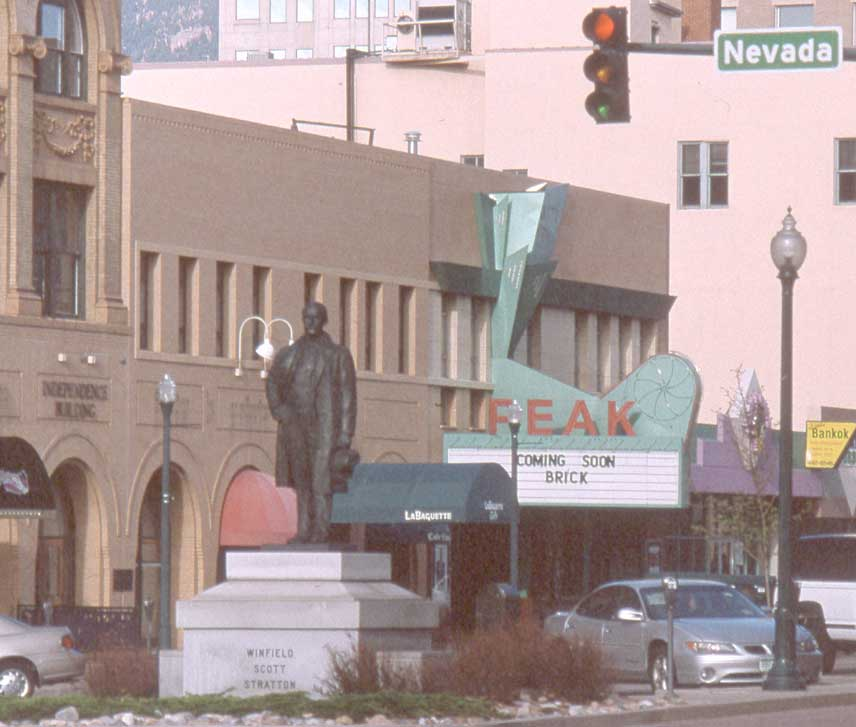
Statue of Stratton in downtown Colorado Springs

Another casting of Walker's statue of Stratton stands in downtown Colorado Springs.

Stratton was inducted into the National Mining Hall of Fame.

In 1967, he was inducted into the Hall of Great Westerners of the National Cowboy & Western Heritage Museum.

=== Places named after Stratton ===
- Stratton Hall at Colorado School of Mines, completed in 1904, was named after Stratton, who gave the school its first philanthropic gift of $25,000. He had been appointed as a CSM trustee in 1899 and was elected president of the board in 1901.

=== Popular culture ===
The actor Gene Evans was cast as Stratton in the 1964 episode, "Sixty-seven Miles of Gold", on the syndicated anthology series, Death Valley Days. hosted by Stanley Andrews. James Best and Jack Albertson played Jimmy Burns and Pearlman, respectively. In the story line, Stratton strikes it rich just as he signs over his mining claim to a syndicate.
