= Evergreen Cemetery (Colorado Springs, Colorado) =

- U.S. National Register of Historic Places
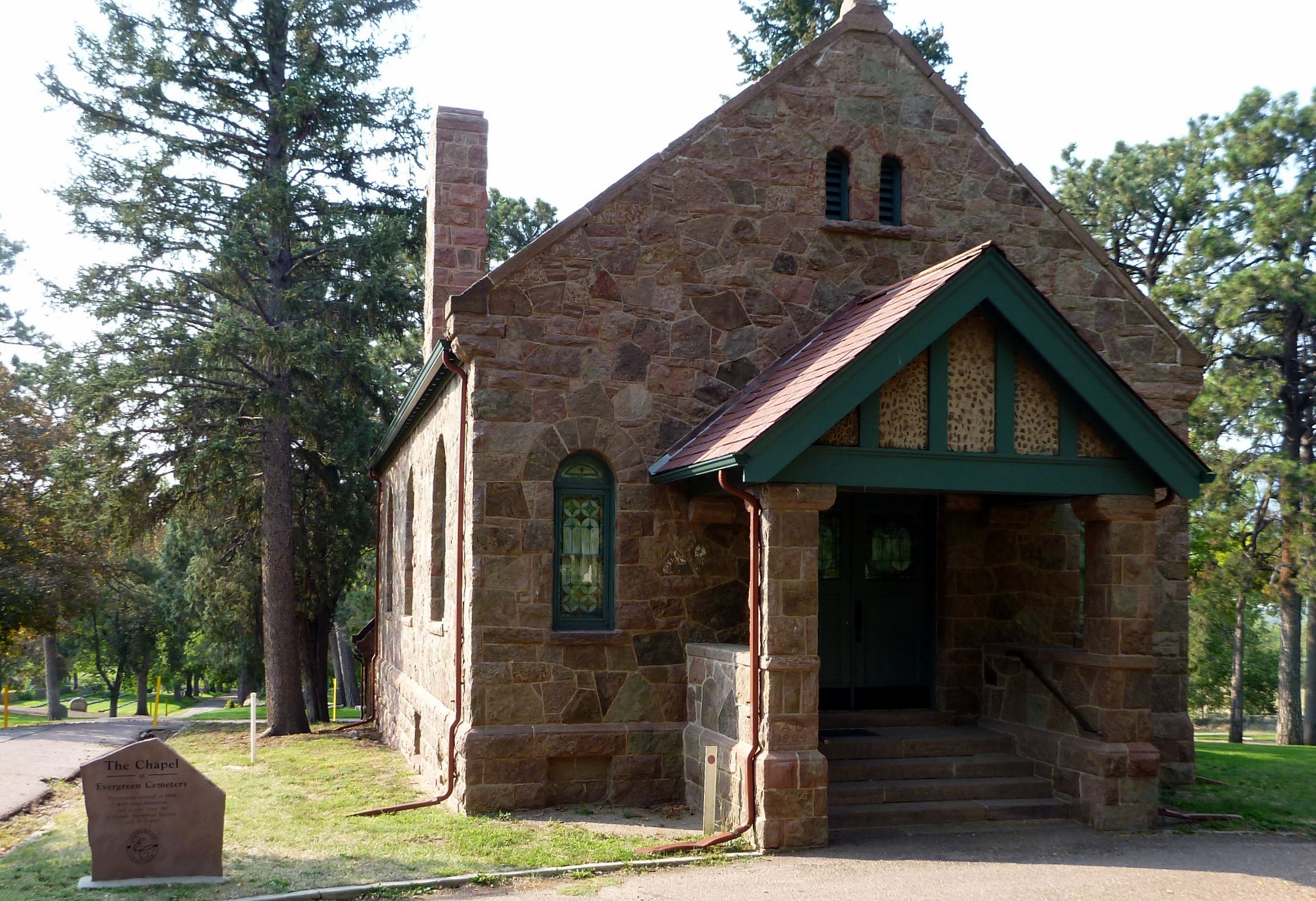

- Location within Colorado Location within the United States
- Location: 1005 S. Hancock Avenue; Colorado Springs, Colorado
- Coordinates: 38°48′56″N 104°47′43″W
- Area: 220 acres (0.89 km^{2})
- Built: 1871
- Architect: L.A. Pease (chapel)
- Landscape architect: John Blair
- Architectural style: Romanesque
- NRHP reference No.: 93000035
- Added to NRHP: February 11, 1993

Evergreen Cemetery is the city-maintained cemetery for Colorado Springs, Colorado, on the National Register of Historic Places in El Paso County, Colorado.

When Colorado Springs was founded in 1871 there were already two cemeteries serving El Paso County but both were quickly found to be inadequate in serving the needs of the rapidly growing city. In 1874, the founder of Colorado Springs, General William Jackson Palmer, founded a new cemetery two miles from town. The original names were the Mount Washington or Mountain Home Cemetery. In 1877, the name was changed to Evergreen Cemetery. In 1875, the original ten acres (4.0 ha) or so was deeded to the city of Colorado Springs and it has been a city owned and operated cemetery since then. In 1993 the cemetery was placed on the National Register of Historic Places. The original ten acres has grown to over 220 acres (0.89 km^{2}) with 90,000 plus burials in 2014 and the cemetery still performs about 700 burials per year.

Evergreen Cemetery is the burial place of many of the people that built the city of Colorado Springs along with founders of many neighboring cities. It is also the burial place of many of the people that made millions from the last Colorado gold rush, world renowned artists, writers and composers, philanthropists, captains of industry and business, Union and Confederate soldiers, sports figures, politicians, actors, and even an astronaut.

== Notable burials ==
- Gretchen "Gretta" McRae (1898–1978), civil rights activist, writer
- William Jackson Palmer (1836–1909), railroad builder, city father
- Winfield Scott Stratton (1848–1902), mine owner, philanthropist
- Edward William Purvis (1857–1888), British officer and Hawaiian official
- Franklin Eli Brooks (1860–1916), politician
- William H. Gill (1886–1976), Major general, U.S. Army
- Leo Arthur Hoegh (1908–2000), military figure
- Helen Hunt Jackson (1830–1885), activist
- Bob Johnson (ice hockey, born 1931) (1931–1991), hockey coach
- Stan Keller (1907–1990), bandleader
- Floyd K. Lindstrom (1912–1944), military figure
- John Franklin Forrest (1927–1997), military figure
- Robert Williamson Steele (1820–1901), territorial governor
- Marshall Sprague (1909–1994), author
- Dale Gardner (1948–2014), astronaut
- Frederick Phillips Raynham (1893–1954), British aviator
- Vic Heyliger (1912–2006), hockey player and coach
- Harry Hunter Seldomridge (1864–1927), politician
- Allen Tupper True (1881–1955), illustrator
- Stephanie Westerfeld (1943–1961), figure skater
- Sharon Westerfeld (1935–1961), sister of Stephanie Westerfeld
- Andy Adams (writer) (1859–1935), writer
- Pat Brady (1914–1972), actor
- Irving Howbert (1846–1934), public servant, businessman
- Sherman Coolidge (1862–1932), Episcopal Church priest, Indian advocate
- Roland W. Reed (Royal Jr.) (1864–1934), artist, photographer
- Hildreth Frost (1880–1955), Captain in Colorado National Guard during Colorado Coalfield War.
- Gerald Lippiatt (1874–1913), union organizer killed in the early stages of the Colorado Coalfield War.
- One Commonwealth war grave, of a Canadian Army soldier of World War I.
- Dorolyn Lines (1901-1975), American engineer
- William A. Conant (1816–1909), American merchant, politician, and railroad agent
- James C. Dobson (1936-2025), American author and psychologist

== See also ==
- National Register of Historic Places listings in El Paso County, Colorado
- Fairview Cemetery (Colorado Springs, Colorado)
