= Myron Stratton Home =

Building in Colorado Springs, Colorado, U.S.

Coordinates: 38.79273°N 104.81748°W

External images
- View of the Myron Stratton Home complex, with a view of the mountains in the background, 1930
- Myron Stratton Home main building, 1930
- Girls playing at a maypole at the Myron Stratton Home
- Front gate to the Myron Stratton Home
- Multiple images of Myron Stratton Home, Pikes Peak Library District Digital Collection

Myron Stratton Home is located off Colorado Highway 115 (South Nevada Avenue) in Colorado Springs in El Paso County, Colorado. It was once a community for children and senior citizens, including a farm. It is now the site of several organizations that support the community and provides housing to a limited number of senior citizens and homeless families.

== History ==
Winfield Scott Stratton, a wealthy gold mine owner and philanthropist, left money in his will to establish the Myron Stratton Home, named for his father. Stratton stipulated that it became "a free home for poor persons who are without means of support and who are physically unable by reason of old age, youth, sickness or other infirmity to earn a livelihood."

Stratton died on September 15, 1902, with a $6 million (equivalent to $223,269,231 in 2025) estate. He left some money to family members, including $50,000 (equivalent to $1,860,577 in 2025) to Isaac Harry Stratton, a son he did not acknowledge during his lifetime. Most of the money was left to open the establishment where poor people could receive food, medical care, and housing. Lawsuits, though, stripped some of the fortune. Isaac Stratton settled for $350,000 (equivalent to $13,024,038 in 2025). A total of $28 million (equivalent to $1.041923077×10^{9} in 2025) in claims were made against the estate, including former employees and partners, women who said they were his wife, and the state. After seven years, most of the claims were denied and the estate was intact.

Construction began in 1909 on a complex "more like a college campus than a poor house". It had residence halls, cottages, landscaped grounds, a power plant, and a farm. The Myron Stratton Home, administered by a board of trustees, opened in 1913. Its residents were to be individuals who were U.S. citizens, residents of El Paso County, and who were not "by reason of disease, insanity, gross indecency or immorality unfit to associate with worthy persons".

The first residents were senior citizens, then children who parents could not afford to support, unwanted children, and orphans. Children lived apart from the elderly, and played and worked on the grounds. When her father died and her mother could not afford to raise her, Edith Ryan Sampson lived at the home from 1919 to 1925. She said that it was "a place where play and work were equal, with kind instructors who never spanked them." She found it to be a "wonderful place" where children learned to share and cooperate with others. Children could learn music, drama, dance, and sewing at the home. Until 1979, when foster care was more prevalent, about 7,000 children lived at Myron Stratton Home. The Devereux Cleo Wallace Center operated a program for troubled children on the grounds until 2004.

The trustees decided in 1991 that senior housing was no longer needed because of the number of other programs and could not be afforded. After a trial by residents, it was ruled that the home should remain open. Existing residents could stay for free. Anyone that came to live at the home thereafter would make payments toward their expenses.

== Overview ==
On campus housing is provided to seniors and a dozen homeless families with children. Organizations on the campus include:

- Peak Vista Community Health Centers—a medical clinic for Myron Stratton Home and nearby residents.
- Partners in Housing—An agency to assist homeless families and a 12-unit complex for families of single mothers.
- TESSA—domestic violence support organization.

Beginning in 2000, the endowment, funded by Stratton's will, has funded grants made to community organizations.

== Notable residents ==
- Floyd K. Lindstrom
