= United States Post Office and Federal Courthouse-Colorado Springs Main =

- US Post Office and Federal Courthouse-Colorado Springs Main
- U.S. National Register of Historic Places
- Colorado State Register of Historic Properties No. 5EP.528
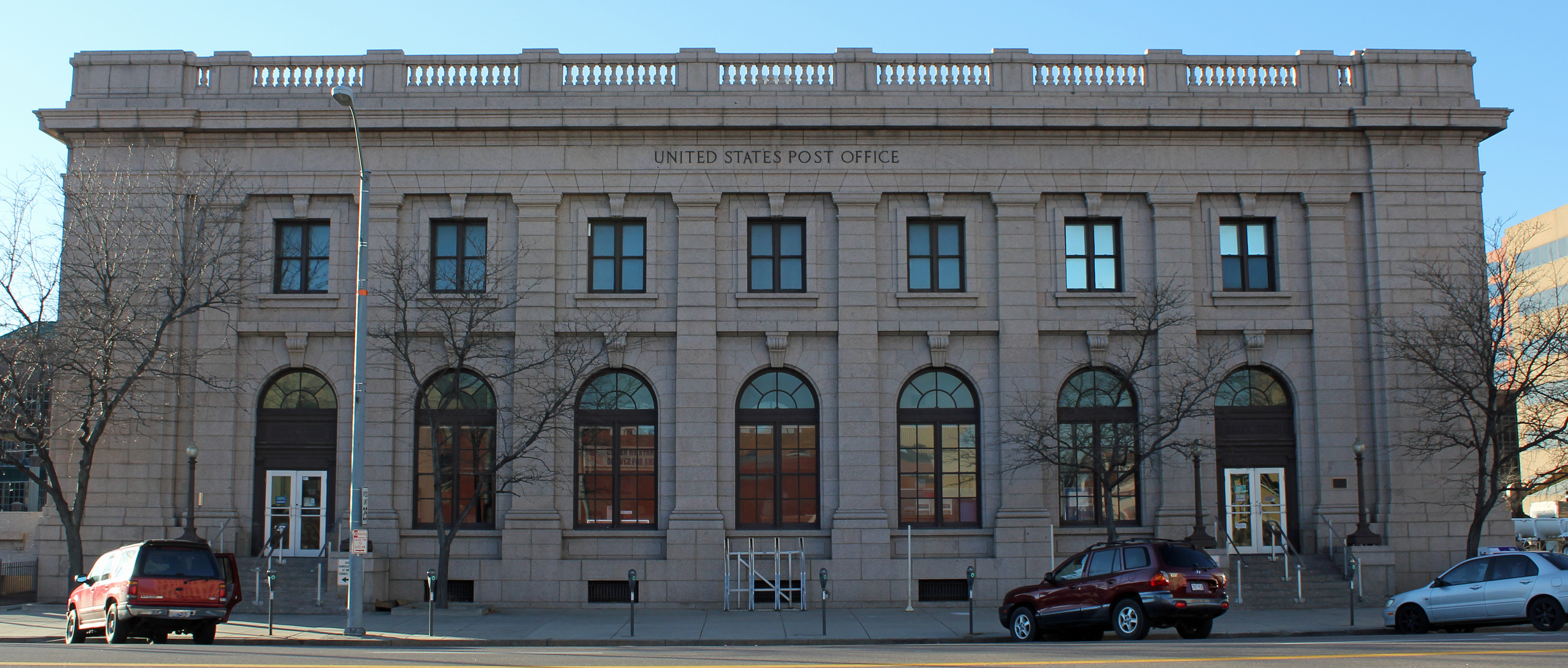

- Location within Colorado Location within the United States
- Location: 210 East Pikes Peak Avenue, Colorado Springs, Colorado
- Coordinates: 38°50′0″N 104°49′15″W
- Built: 1908-1910
- Architect: James Knox Taylor
- Architectural style: Renaissance Revival / Beaux-Arts
- NRHP reference No.: 86000170
- CSRHP No.: 5EP.528

Significant dates
- Added to NRHP: January 22, 1986
- Designated CSRHP: January 22, 1986

US Post Office and Federal Courthouse-Colorado Springs Main, also known as the Colorado Springs Post Office and Federal Courthouse, is a historic federal building that serves as a post office and courthouse. It is located at 210 East Pikes Peak Avenue in Colorado Springs, Colorado. The Renaissance Revival - Beaux-Arts style building is listed on the National Register of Historic Places. and is on the Colorado State Register of Historic Properties.

== Overview ==
The land for the property was donated by Winfield Scott Stratton. Designed by James Knox Taylor the building was constructed between 1908 and 1910. Taylor, Supervising Architect of the Department of the Treasury, oversaw the design of 30 federal buildings. It was the city's first federal building. It is made of granite and is a Beaux-Arts design of an Italian Renaissance Revival.

== See also ==
- List of United States post offices
