= National Register of Historic Places listings in Teller County, Colorado =

Location of Teller County in Colorado

This is a list of the National Register of Historic Places listings in Teller County, Colorado.

This is intended to be a complete list of the properties and districts on the National Register of Historic Places in Teller County, Colorado, United States. The locations of National Register properties and districts for which the latitude and longitude coordinates are included below, may be seen in a map.

There are 11 properties and districts listed on the National Register in the county, including 1 National Historic Landmark.

This National Park Service list is complete through NPS recent listings posted August 28, 2026.

== Current listings ==
	Name on the Register	Image	Date listed	Location	City or town	Description
1	Cripple Creek Historic District	Cripple Creek Historic District	October 15, 1966 (#66000939)	State Highway 67; 38°45′07″N 105°10′31″W	Cripple Creek	
2	Crystola Bridge	Crystola Bridge	March 10, 2023 (#100008724)	.06 miles (0.097 km) north of Crystola on Teller Cty. Rd. 21; 38°58′11″N 105°02′23″W	Crystola	
3	Florissant School	Florissant School	October 1, 1990 (#90001503)	2009 County Road 31; 38°56′54″N 105°17′41″W	Florissant	
4	Goldfield City Hall and Fire Station	Goldfield City Hall and Fire Station	May 17, 1984 (#84000897)	Victor Ave. and 9th St. 38°43′06″N 105°07′25″W	Goldfield	
5	Hornbek House	Hornbek House	December 8, 1981 (#81000105)	County Road 1; 38°55′34″N 105°16′56″W	Florissant	
6	Manitou Experimental Forest Station	Manitou Experimental Forest Station	August 28, 1998 (#98001091)	232 County Road 79; 39°06′00″N 105°05′30″W	Woodland Park	
7	Midland Terminal Railroad Depot	Midland Terminal Railroad Depot	May 17, 1984 (#84000899)	230 N. 4th St. 38°42′45″N 105°08′25″W	Victor	
8	Stratton's Independence Mine and Mill	Stratton's Independence Mine and Mill	March 4, 1993 (#93000054)	Junction of Rangeview Rd. and State Highway 67; 38°42′39″N 105°08′00″W	Victor	
9	Twin Creek Ranch	Twin Creek Ranch	February 7, 1997 (#97000029)	1465 Teller County Road 31; 38°57′04″N 105°18′09″W	Florissant	
10	Victor Downtown Historic District	Victor Downtown Historic District	July 3, 1985 (#85001463)	Roughly bounded by Diamond Ave., 2nd, Portland, and 5th Sts. 38°42′39″N 105°08′25″W	Victor	
11	Victor Hotel	Victor Hotel	April 10, 1980 (#80000929)	4th St. and Victor Ave. 38°42′38″N 105°08′26″W	Victor	

== See also ==
- List of National Historic Landmarks in Colorado
- List of National Register of Historic Places in Colorado
- Bibliography of Colorado
- Geography of Colorado
- History of Colorado
- Index of Colorado-related articles
- List of Colorado-related lists
- Outline of Colorado
