= Victor Downtown Historic District =

Historic district in Colorado, United States

- U.S. National Register of Historic Places
- U.S. Historic district
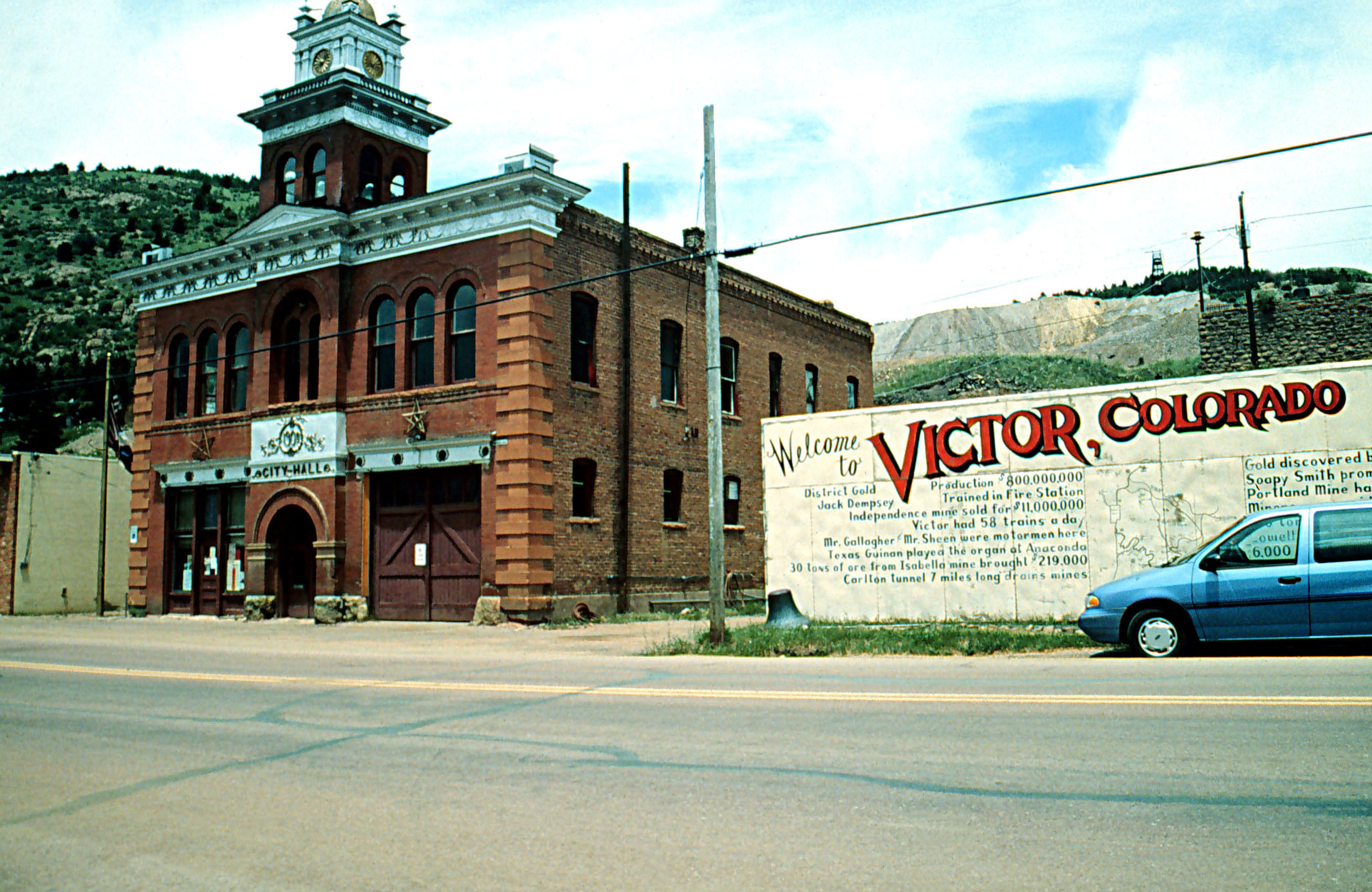
- Victor City Hall

- Location within Colorado Location within the United States
- Location: Roughly bounded by Diamond Ave., Second, Portland and 5th Sts., Victor, Colorado
- Coordinates: 38°42′39″N 105°8′25″W
- Area: 22 acres (8.9 ha)
- Architectural style: Late 19th and 20th Century Revivals, Romanesque
- NRHP reference No.: 85001463
- Added to NRHP: July 3, 1985

Victor Downtown Historical District is a 22 acres (8.9 ha) historic district encompassing several blocks of Victor, Colorado which was listed in the National Register of Historic Places in 1985. The listing included 55 contributing buildings out of 66 buildings in total. The district is bounded roughly by Diamond Avenue, Second, Portland and Fifth Streets.

It includes:

- Page Building (1899), 123 4th Street, a two-story brick commercial building
- Assay Office/Rooming House (c.1899), 119-121 4th Street, a two-story brick commercial building with brick corbelling and a projecting cornice.
- Gift Shop (1899), 415 Victor Avenue, a two-story, brick building with a plain boxed cornice and a paneled parapet
- Boston Building (1900), 410 Victor Avenue, two-story brick commercial building.
- Midland Terminal Railroad Depot
- Stratton's Independence Mine and Mill
- Victor City Hall
- Victor Hotel
- Western Federation of Miners Union Hall
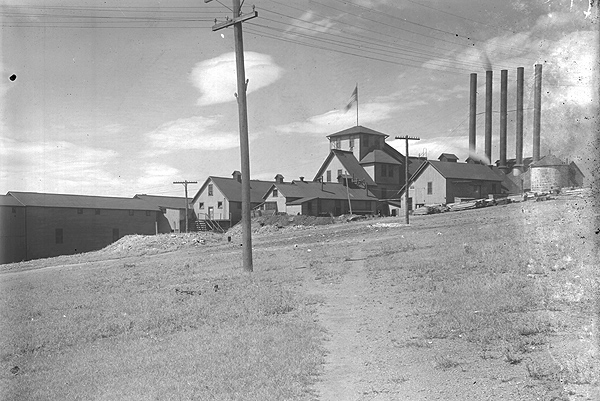
Stratton's Independence Mine and Mill

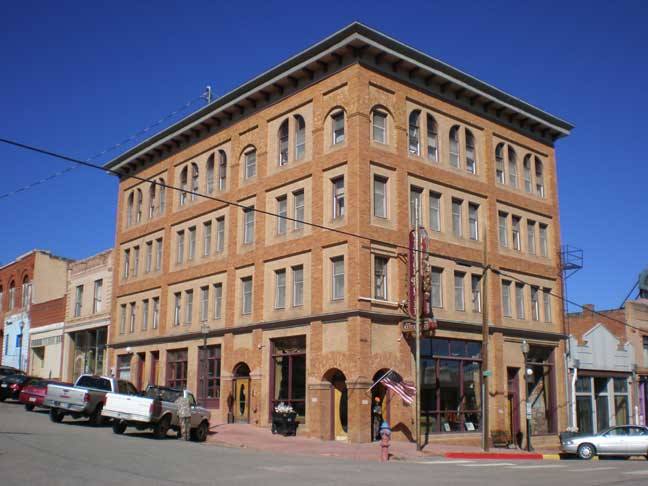
Victor Hotel

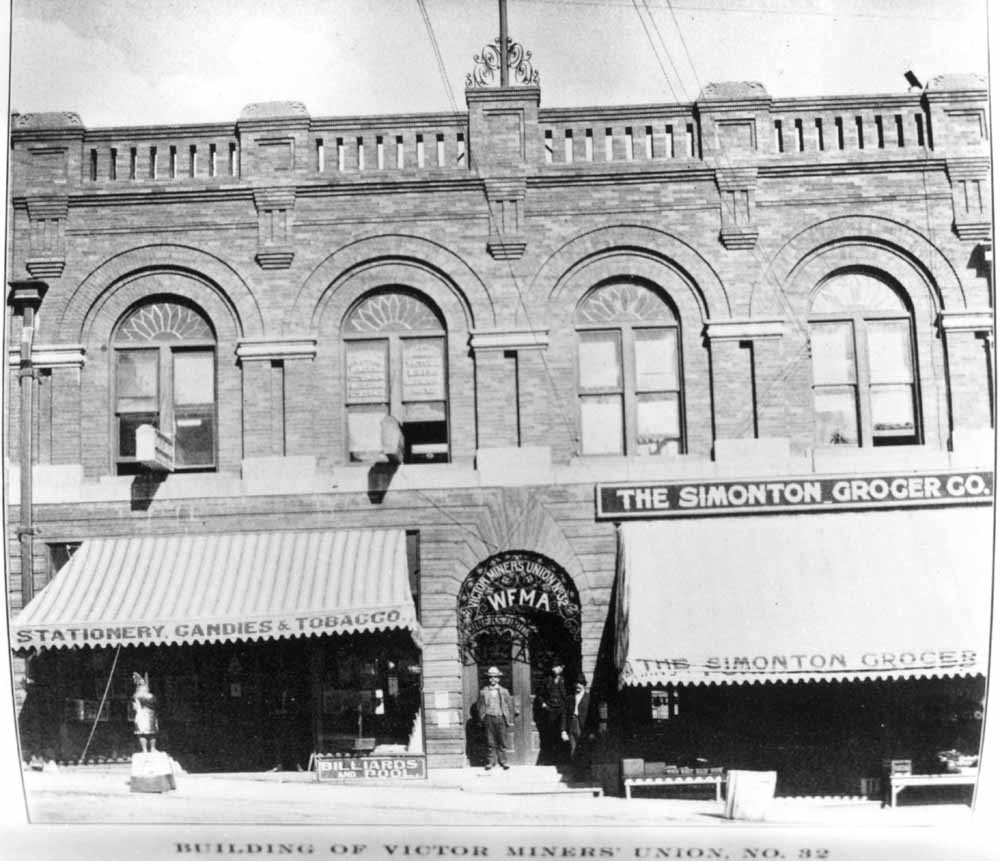
Western Federation of Miners Union Hall

== See also ==
- Cripple Creek miners' strike of 1894
- Colorado Labor Wars
- National Register of Historic Places listings in Teller County, Colorado
