= Shelf Road =

Shelf Road may refer to:

- Shelf Road in Fourmile Canyon (Fremont County, Colorado)
- Shelf Road in the Ojai Valley (Ventura County, California)
