= Arequa Gulch Bridge =

Highest bridge - Colorado State Highways

Coordinates: 38.7133°N 105.1656°W

The Arequa Gulch Bridge is the highest bridge on the Colorado State Highway system. Built in 2000–2001, the bridge spans the Arequa Gulch. It is 250 feet tall at its highest point and 1,212 feet long. The Arequa Gulch bridge is located on Colorado State Highway 67 between Victor and Cripple Creek, Colorado. The bridge was financed by the Cripple Creek & Victor Gold Mining Company (CC&V) as part of a highway realignment project to facilitate the expansion of their valley fill facility.

The Arequa Gulch Bridge is part of the Gold Belt National Scenic Byway, which tours scenic gold mining towns in Colorado and traces the routes of railroads associated with the Colorado gold boom of the early 1890s.

== History ==
The bridge was completed in October 2001, two years after the initial feasibility study. The Arequa Gulch Bridge won a 2003 Long Span Bridge Award from the NSBA (National Steel Bridge Alliance).

== Description ==
The Arequa Gulch Bridge is a 5-span, 1,212-ft long bridge. It is a steel plate girder bridge supported by piers. A scenic pullover was included as part of the construction project to provide views of the Sangre De Cristo Mountains that were previously inaccessible by motor vehicle. The bridge is equipped with a de-icing system that automatically sprays liquid de-icers when sensors detect potentially icy conditions.

== Significance ==
This bridge is notable for its height, its expansive views of the Sangre de Cristo Mountains, and as one of the most expensive highway projects in the state of Colorado that was financed completely with private dollars. The Arequa Gulch Bridge was recognized for its engineering and structural design with a 2003 NSBA Prize Bridges Merit Award in the Long Span category. The awards, organized by the NSBA, honor outstanding steel bridge designs across the United States.

== See also ==
- Victor, Colorado
- Gold Belt Tour Scenic and Historic Byway
- Cripple Creek, Colorado
- Sangre de Cristo Mountains
- Teller County, Colorado
- List of Colorado Scenic and Historic Byways
- List of bridges in the United States by height
