= Phantom Canyon (Pikes Peak Area) =

Canyon in Colorado, United States

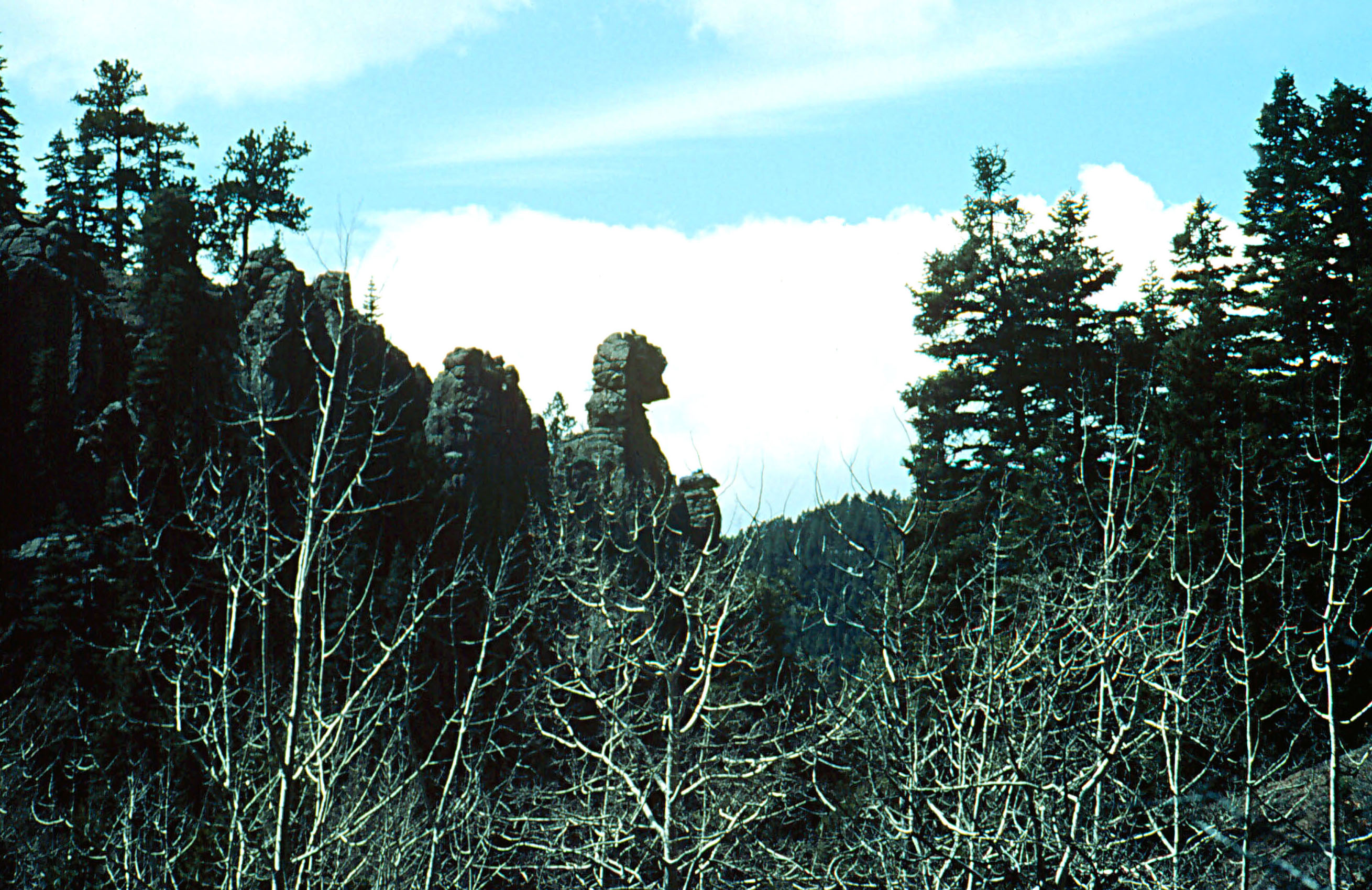
- "The Chief" rock formation in Phantom Canyon

Geography
- Country: United States
- State: Colorado
- Counties: Fremont County; Teller County

Phantom Canyon is a canyon in Colorado, in the Western United States. The canyon is formed by Eight Mile Creek. The Florence and Cripple Creek Railroad developed it as a route to take gold and supplies in and out of the Cripple Creek and Victor gold mining district.

Phantom Canyon Road, a portion of the Gold Belt Byway that runs through the canyon, is an unpaved road connecting Cañon City and Victor. The road is popularly used for mountain biking and off-roading.

Since 1996, Phantom Canyon has been designated an Area of Critical Environmental Concern by the Bureau of Land Management (BLM). Information on camping in the canyon's undeveloped campsites and other recreational activities is available from the BLM Field Office in Cañon City
