= Hornbek House =

Historic house in Colorado, United States

- U.S. National Register of Historic Places
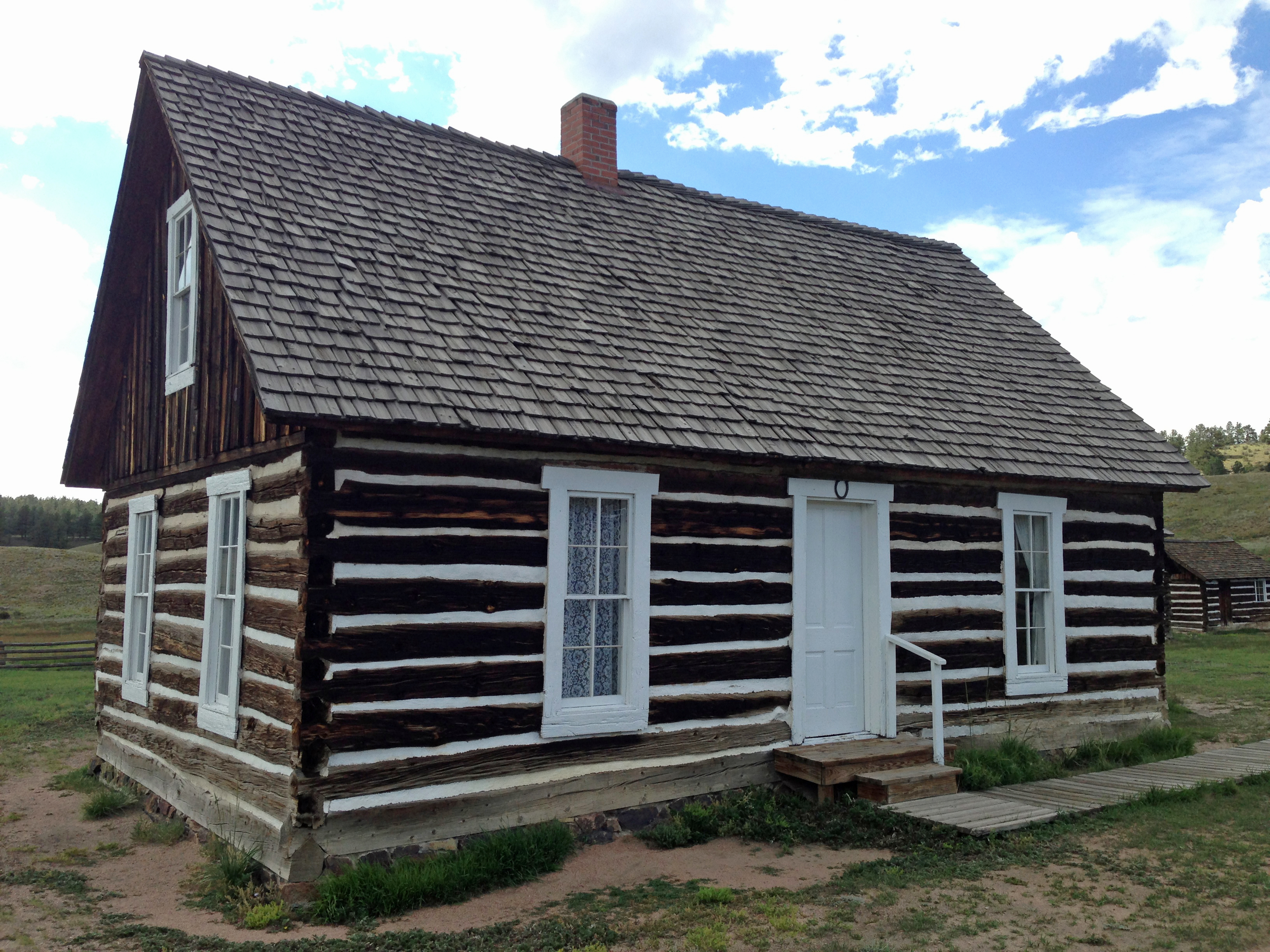

- Location within Colorado Location within the United States
- Location: Florissant Fossil Beds National Monument, Teller County, Colorado, USA
- Nearest city: Florissant, Colorado
- Coordinates: 38°55′34″N 105°16′56″W
- Built: 1878
- Architectural style: Greek Revival
- NRHP reference No.: 81000105
- Added to NRHP: December 08, 1981

The Hornbek House, also known as the Adaline Hornbek Homestead, in Florissant, Colorado was built in 1878 by Adaline Hornbek, who established a ranch in the area to the west of Pike's Peak in the 1870s. The log house is listed on the National Register of Historic Places as an example of an early homestead. It is an excellent example of homestead-era log construction, with unusual Greek Revival window trim on one wing. The property includes a number of outbuildings which were relocated to the site. The property was sold to the National Park Service in 1973 and is included in Florissant Fossil Beds National Monument.

Adaline Hornbek was an early homesteader who established a substantial ranch in an area that had seen only subsistence farming.

== See also ==
- National Register of Historic Places listings in Teller County, Colorado
