= Victor station (Colorado) =

- Midland Terminal Railroad Depot
- U.S. National Register of Historic Places
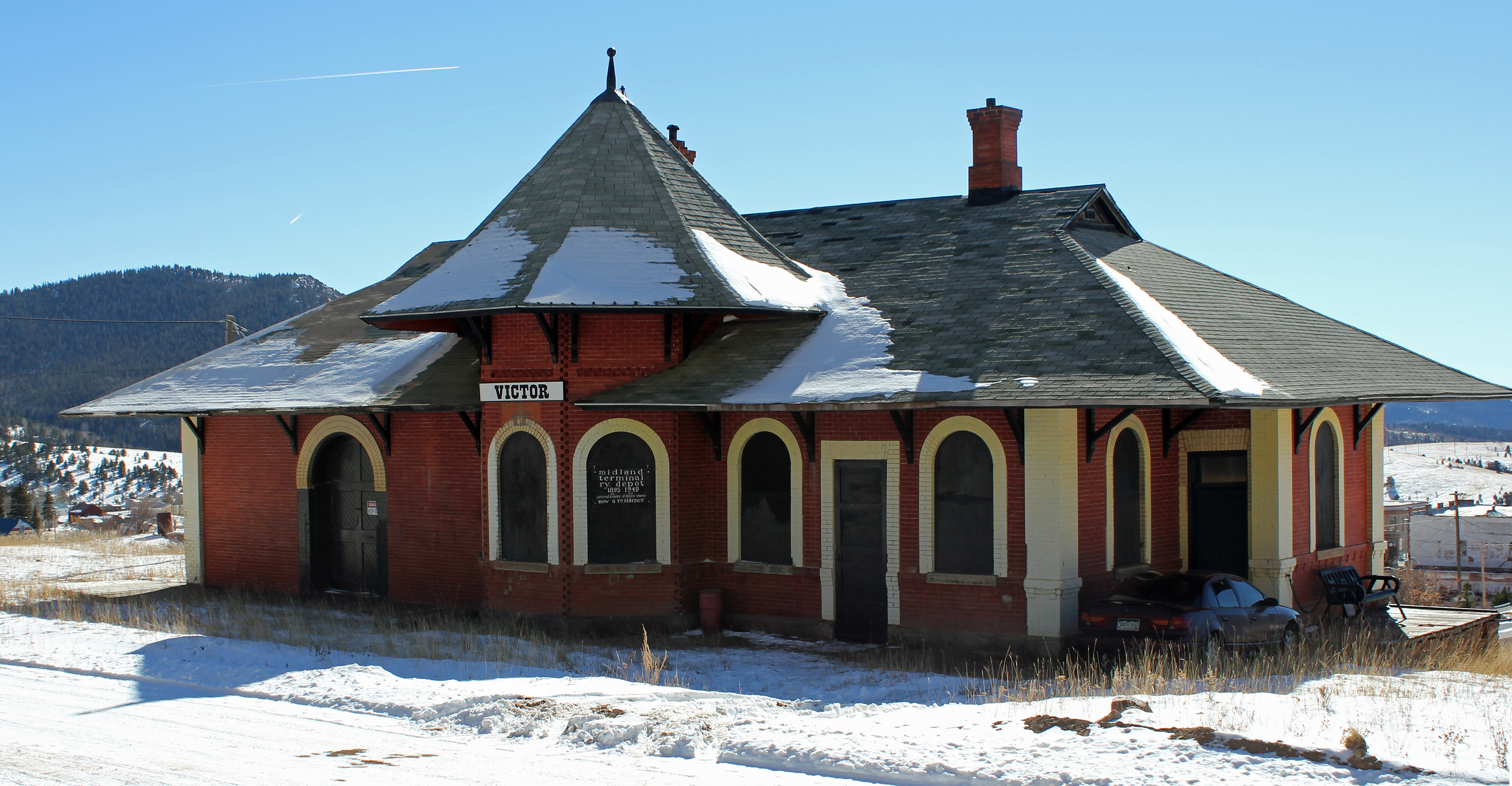
- The building is now a private residence.

- Location within Colorado Location within the United States
- Location: 230 N. 4th St., Victor, Colorado
- Coordinates: 38°42′45″N 105°8′25″W
- Area: 0.1 acres (0.040 ha)
- Built: 1895
- NRHP reference No.: 84000899
- Added to NRHP: May 17, 1984

The Midland Terminal Railroad Depot in Victor, Colorado, was built in 1895 for the Midland Terminal Railway.

Colorado Midland Railroad established the Midland Terminal Railroad for a spur line between Divide and Cripple Creek and then to Victor. This allowed for ore to be transported via train rather than wagons for processing in Old Colorado City.

The brick depot contains features common to its type and period of construction including the wide overhanging eaves, the central bay office window, and the large freight doors.

== See also ==
- National Register of Historic Places listings in Teller County, Colorado
