= Western Federation of Miners Union Hall =

Miners' Union Hall
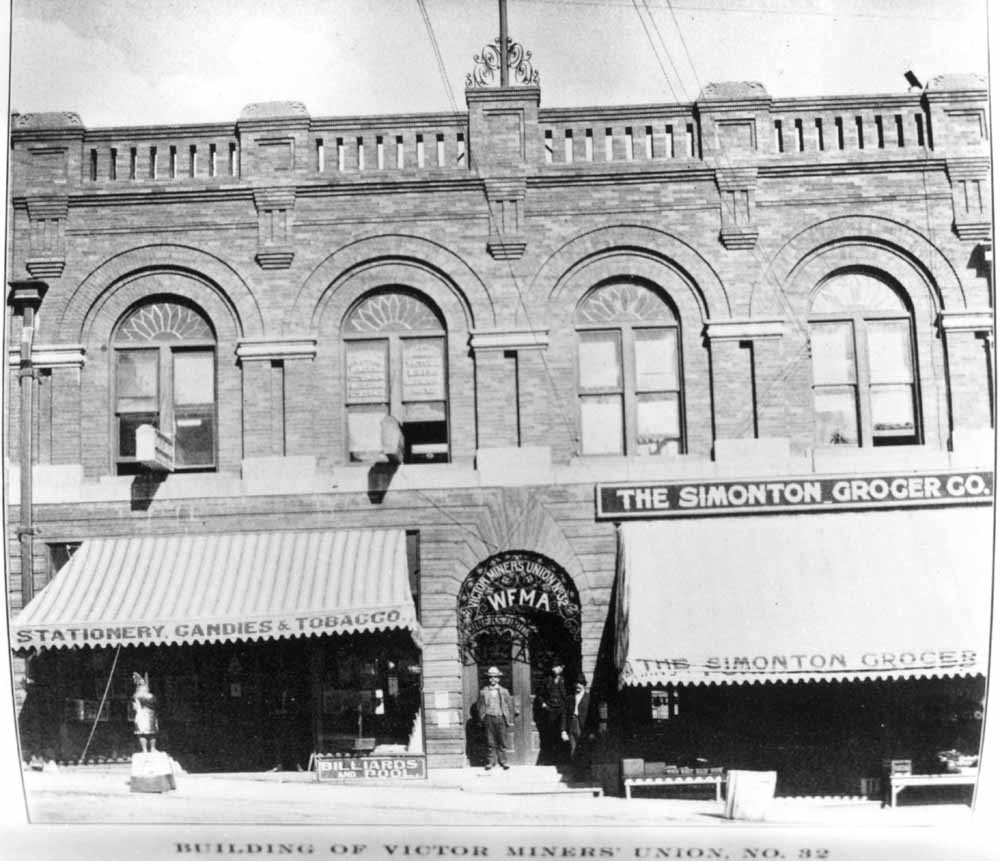
- The union hall in 1903

General information
- Location: 110 North 4th Street, Victor, Colorado, United States
- Coordinates: 38°42′38″N 105°8′27″W
- Completed: 1901

Website
- wfmhall.org

The Western Federation of Miners Union Hall is a historic building in danger of collapse in the Victor Downtown Historic District of Victor, Colorado.

The building was a meeting place for the members of Western Federation of Miners Local No. 32. In June 1904, the Colorado National Guard shot at miners taking refuge in the union hall during the Colorado Labor Wars. The building bears at least nine bullet holes from the attack.

The union deeded the hall to the Victor School District in the 1920s. It was abandoned in the 1970s and used briefly in the 1980s as a restaurant.

As of 2005, two of the five beams supporting the roof have broken and the group applied for a grant from the Colorado Historical Society to replace the roof.

In July 2008 the building was sold to a nearby shop owner. The Victor Heritage Society is working to rescue and restore the building.
