= Fourmile Canyon (Fremont County, Colorado) =

Fourmile Canyon or Four Mile Canyon is a canyon carved by Fourmile Creek. It is located north of Canon City in Fremont County, Colorado.

The associated Fourmile Creek or Four Mile Creek is a tributary of the Arkansas River. The confluence with the Arkansas River is located at 38.4280°N 105.1906°W, 1.4 km north of Brookside, Colorado.

The canyon wall is the location of the southern portion of Shelf Road, which is part of the Gold Belt Scenic Byway.
