= Goldfield City Hall and Fire Station =

- U.S. National Register of Historic Places
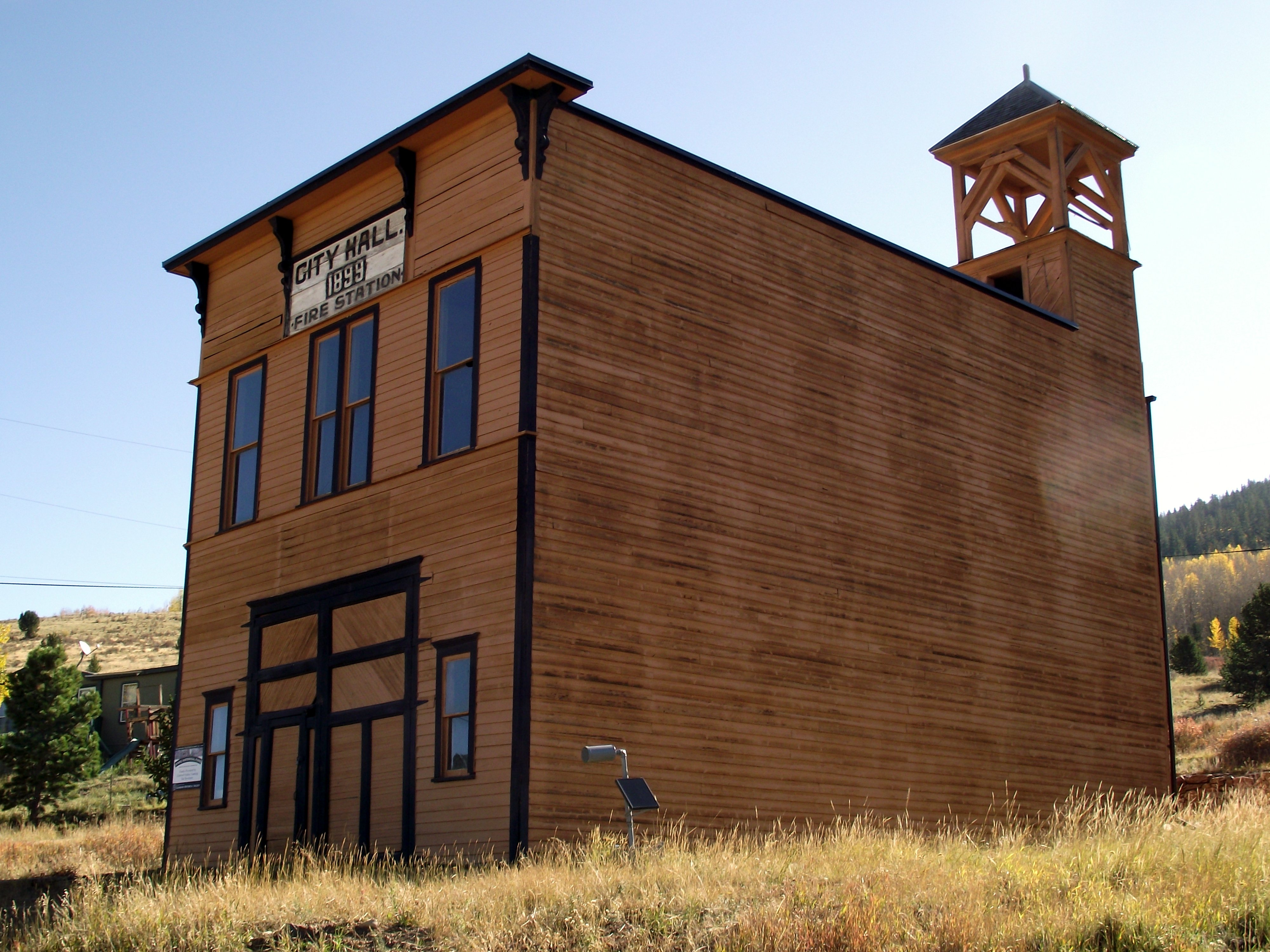

- Location within Colorado
- Location: Victor Ave. and 9th St., Goldfield, Colorado
- Coordinates: 38°43′06″N 105°07′25″W
- Area: 0.1 acres (0.040 ha)
- Built: 1899
- NRHP reference No.: 84000897
- Added to NRHP: May 17, 1984

The Goldfield City Hall and Fire Station, at Victor Ave. and 9th St. in Goldfield, Colorado, was built in 1899. It was listed on the National Register of Historic Places in 1984.

It is a two-story flat-roofed 25 by 46 feet (7.6 m × 14.0 m) building.

By 1983, it was the only remaining public structure of Goldfield.
