= Gold Belt Tour Scenic and Historic Byway =

Colorado Scenic and Historic Byway

Coordinates: 38.7466°N 105.1784°W

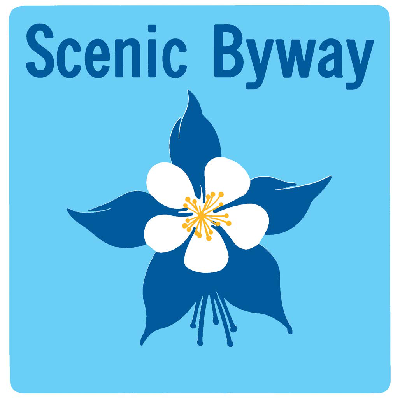
Gold Belt Tour Scenic and Historic Byway

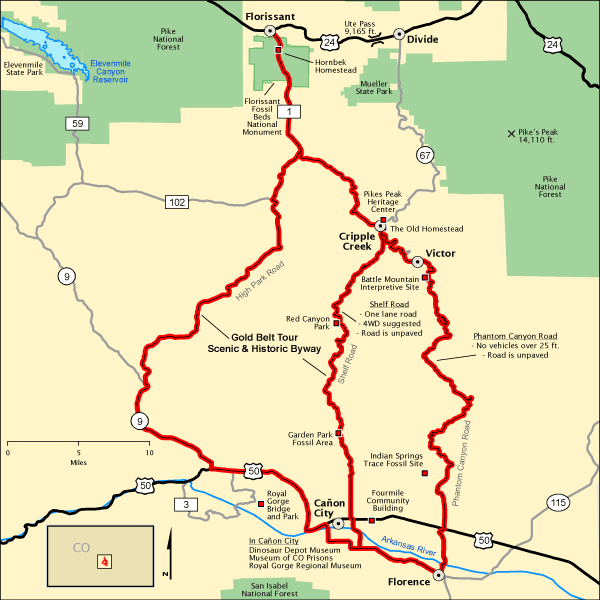

Route information
- Maintained by CDOT
- Length: 131 mi (211 km)
- Existed: 2000–present

Major junctions
- South end: US 50 / SH 115 Cañon City
- North end: US 24 Florissant

Location
- Country: United States
- State: Colorado
- Counties: Fremont, Teller

Highway system
- Scenic Byways; National; National Forest; BLM; NPS; Colorado State Highway System; Interstate; US; State; Scenic

The Gold Belt Tour Scenic and Historic Byway is a National Scenic Byway, a Back Country Byway, and a Colorado Scenic and Historic Byway located in Fremont and Teller counties, Colorado, USA. The byway is named for the Gold Belt mining region. The Cripple Creek Historic District is a National Historic Landmark. The byway forms a three-legged loop with the Phantom Canyon Road (narrow gravel), the Shelf Road (narrow unimproved), and the High Park Road (paved).

== Route ==
The Gold Belt Byway contains many roads. Most of them are dirt roads that are narrow and run through canyons and other geological features.

=== Phantom Canyon Road ===
Phantom Canyon Road is a scenic road that connects Cañon City and Victor. The road goes through Phantom Canyon where it has two tunnels, three elevated bridges and many camp locations. It was originally the route of a railroad that connected Florence and Cripple Creek. The route contains many narrow roads and high wooden bridges. The road is unpaved.

=== Shelf Road ===
Shelf Road is a portion of the byway going through Fourmile Canyon and was originally used as a stagecoach road. The cliffs of the canyon near Shelf Road offer some of the best sport climbing in Colorado.

=== High Park Road ===
High Park Road was the first route to connect gold mines with the Arkansas Valley. Unlike Shelf Road and Phantom Canyon Road, it doesn't run through a canyon and is entirely paved. High Park Road is located in area where cattle ranching takes place.

=== Teller County Road 1 ===
Teller County Road 1, shortened to Teller 1, was the first stagecoach route to Cripple Creek and thus it is called County Road 1. It is a paved road that offers diverse views of scenery. For example, along the road are steep mountains and rolling hills where cattle graze.

=== Gold Camp Road ===
Gold Camp Road follows the former railroad from Colorado Springs to Cripple Creek called the "Short Line". In the 1920s the railroad was converted to a car toll road, eventually becoming a free public road. In 1988, tunnel #3 collapsed and was never repaired. This portion of the road is now closed to vehicular traffic and is popular with bikers and hikers, and vehicular traffic was rerouted to Old Stage Road behind The Broadmoor. In September 2013, flooding washed out a large portion of the road between tunnels one and two. It is said that the tunnels are haunted and many stories abound concerning the tunnels.

== Attractions ==
- Colorado Territorial Prison Museum
- Cripple Creek Historic District, a National Historic Landmark
- Cripple Creek and Victor Narrow Gauge Railroad
- Florissant Fossil Beds National Monument
- Garden Park Fossil Area, a National Natural Landmark
- Gold Camp Road
- Phantom Canyon
- Pikes Peak, a National Historic Landmark
- Royal Gorge
- Shelf Road

== Gallery ==
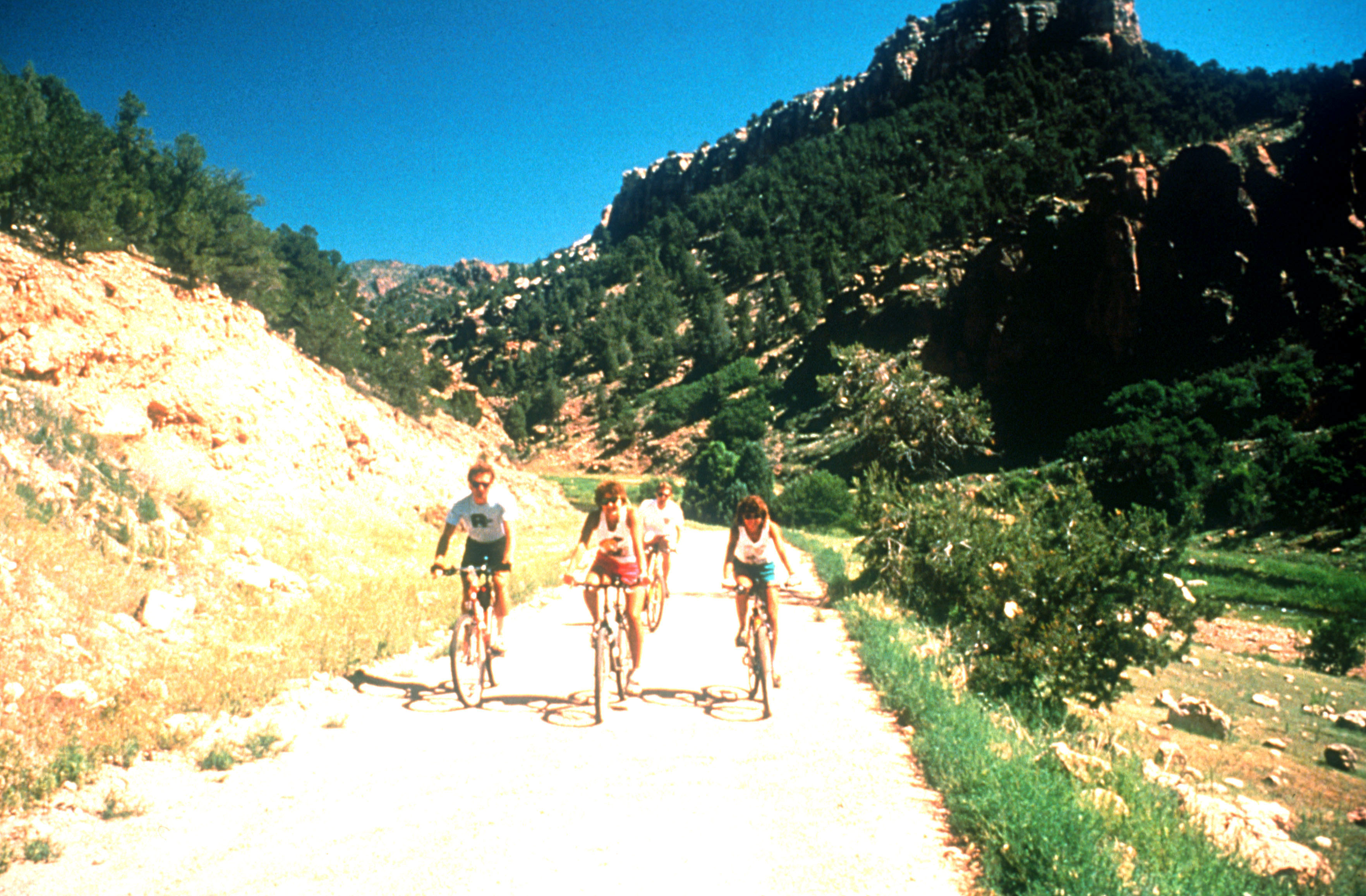
Cycling along the Gold Belt Tour Scenic and Historic Byway

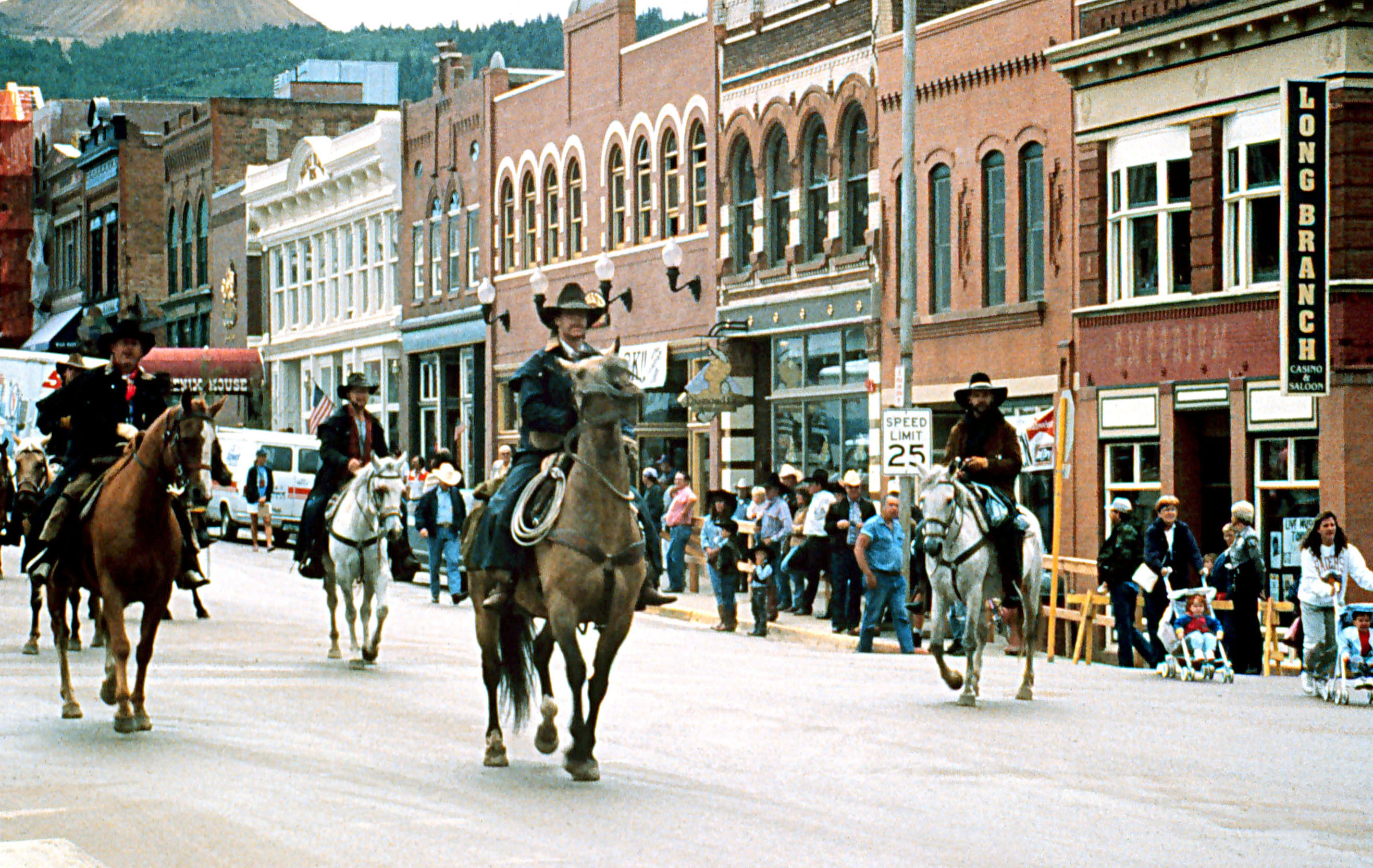
Cripple Creek Historic District

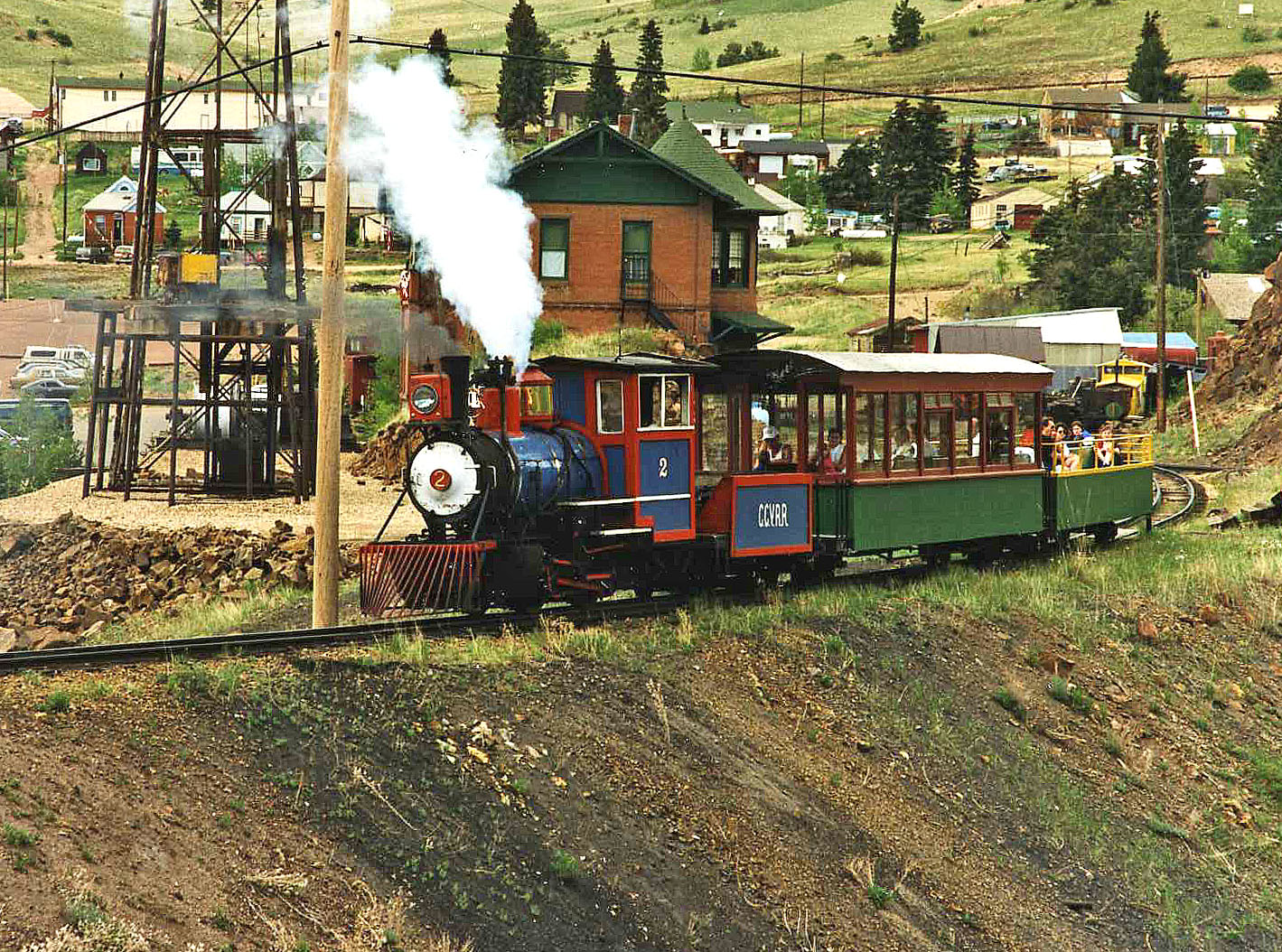
Cripple Creek and Victor Narrow Gauge Railroad

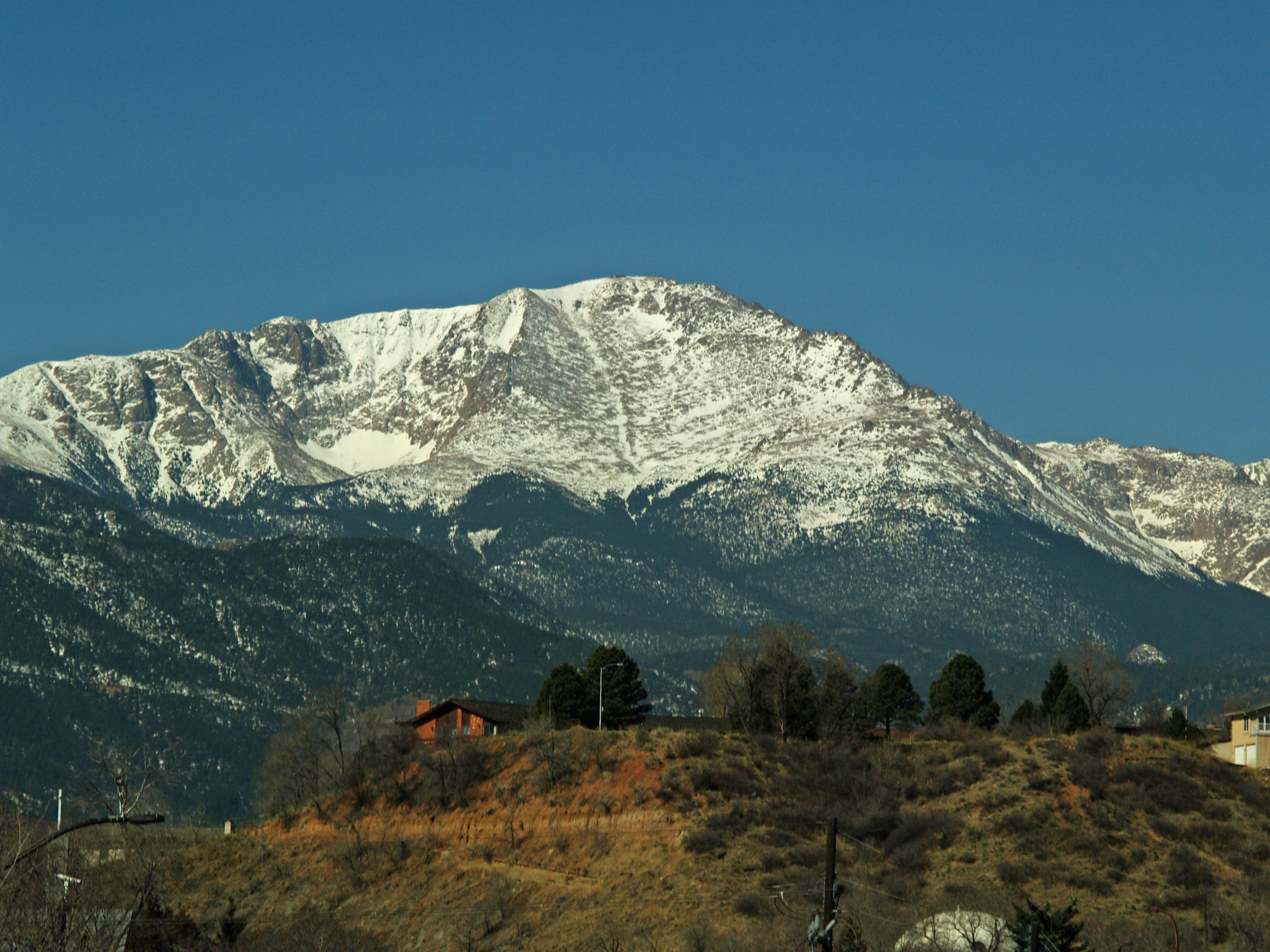
Pikes Peak from the Gold Belt Tour Scenic and Historic Byway

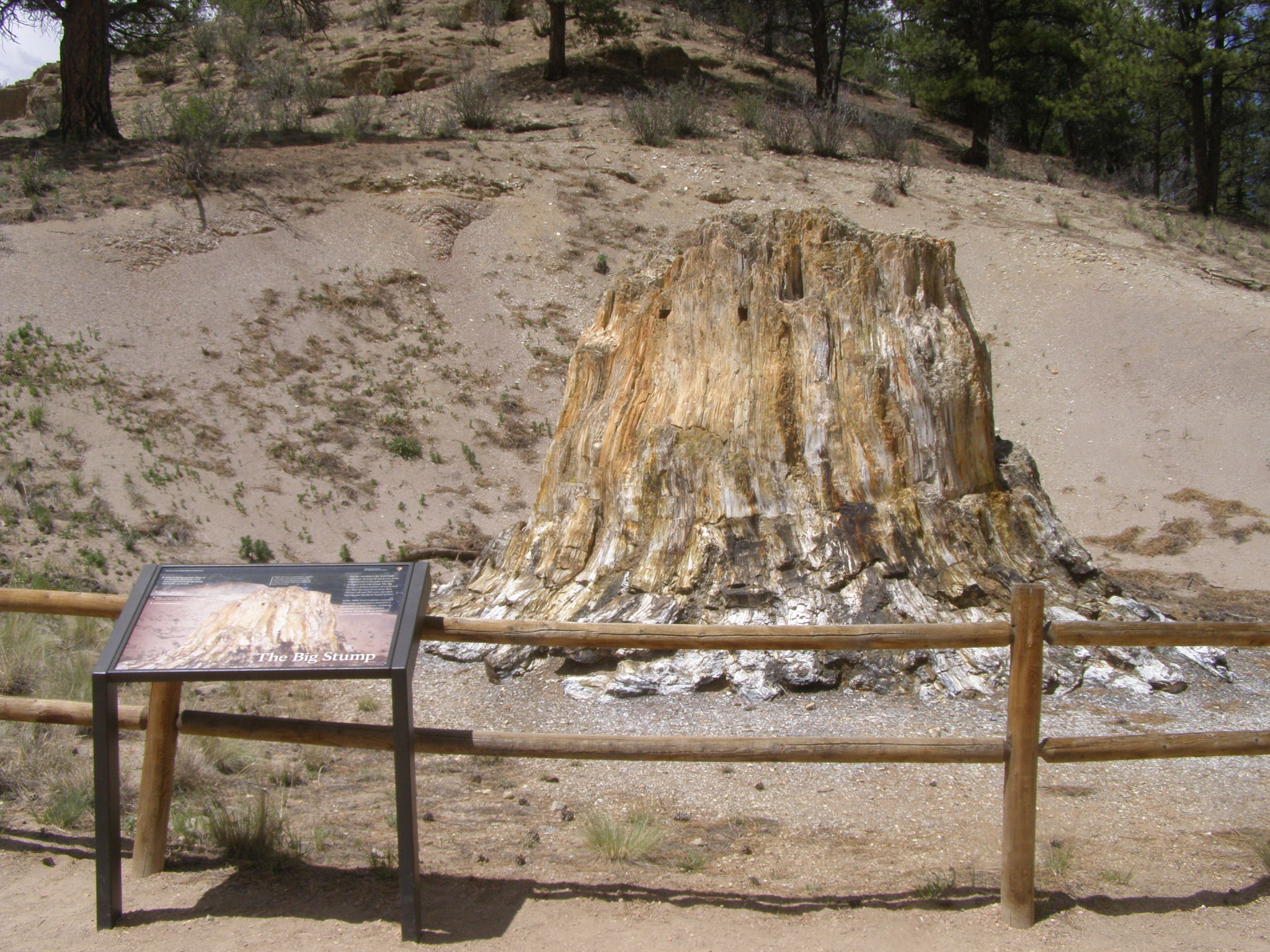
Petrified redwood stump in Florissant Fossil Beds National Monument

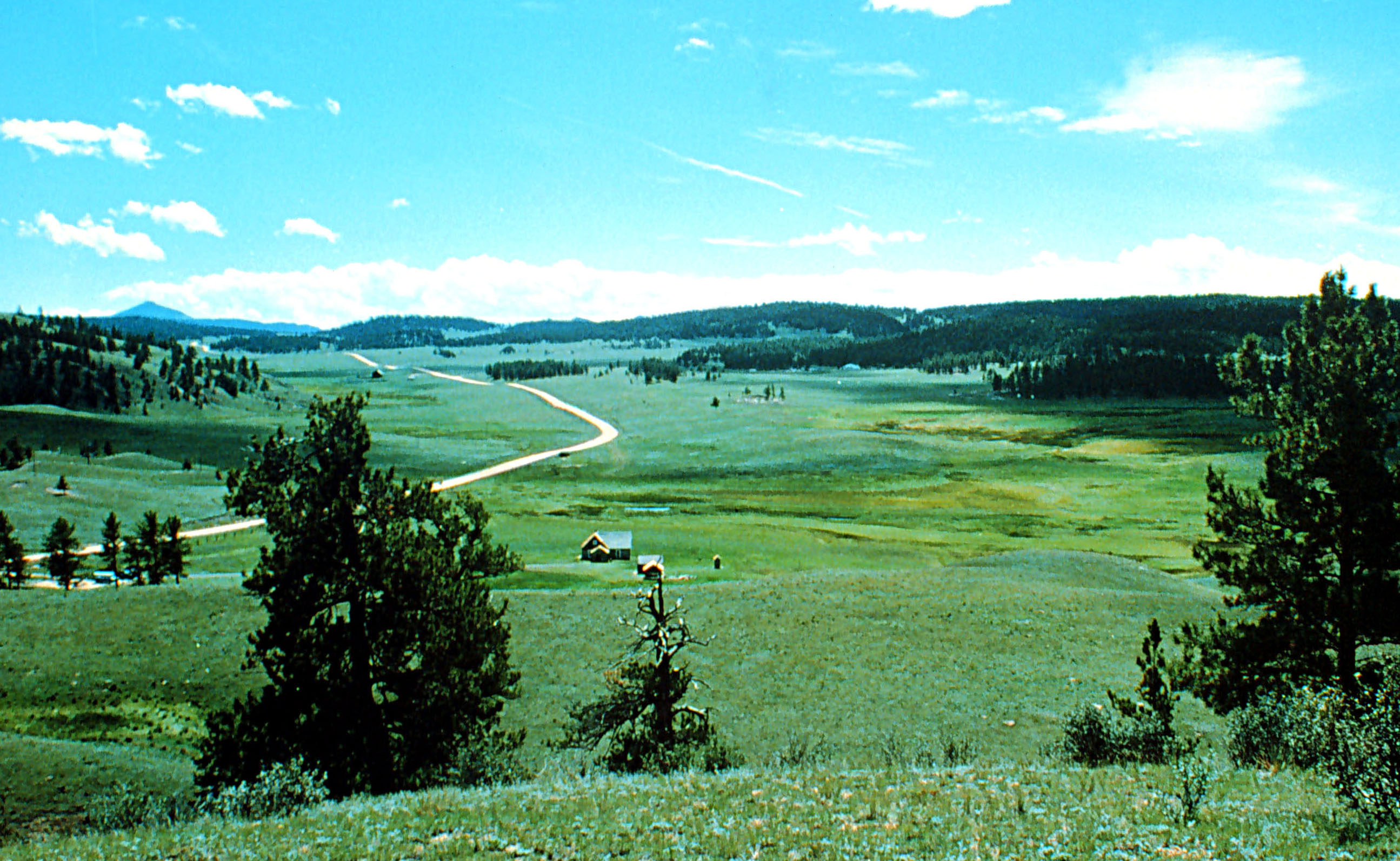
Florissant Valley

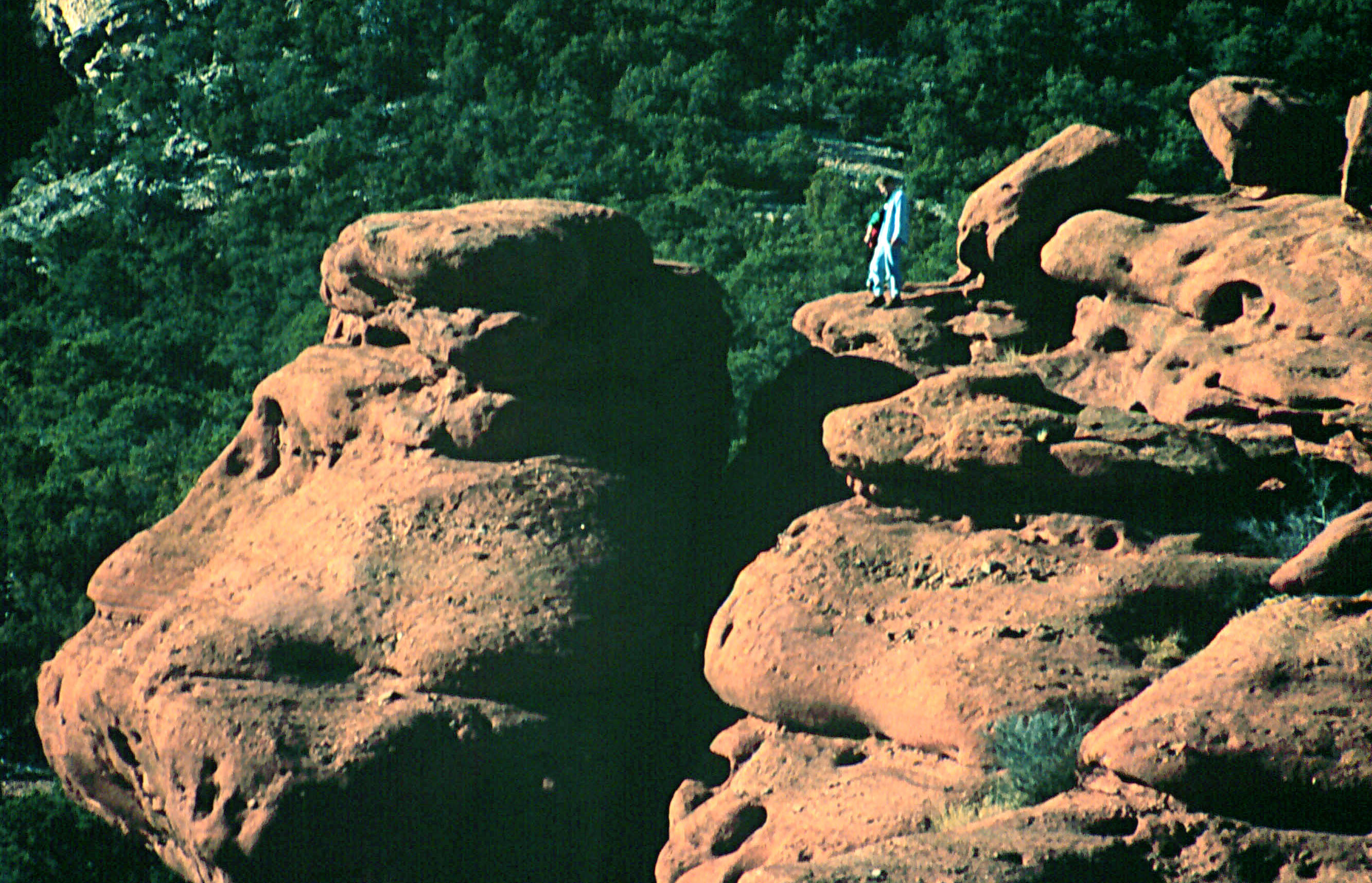
A climber above the Shelf Road

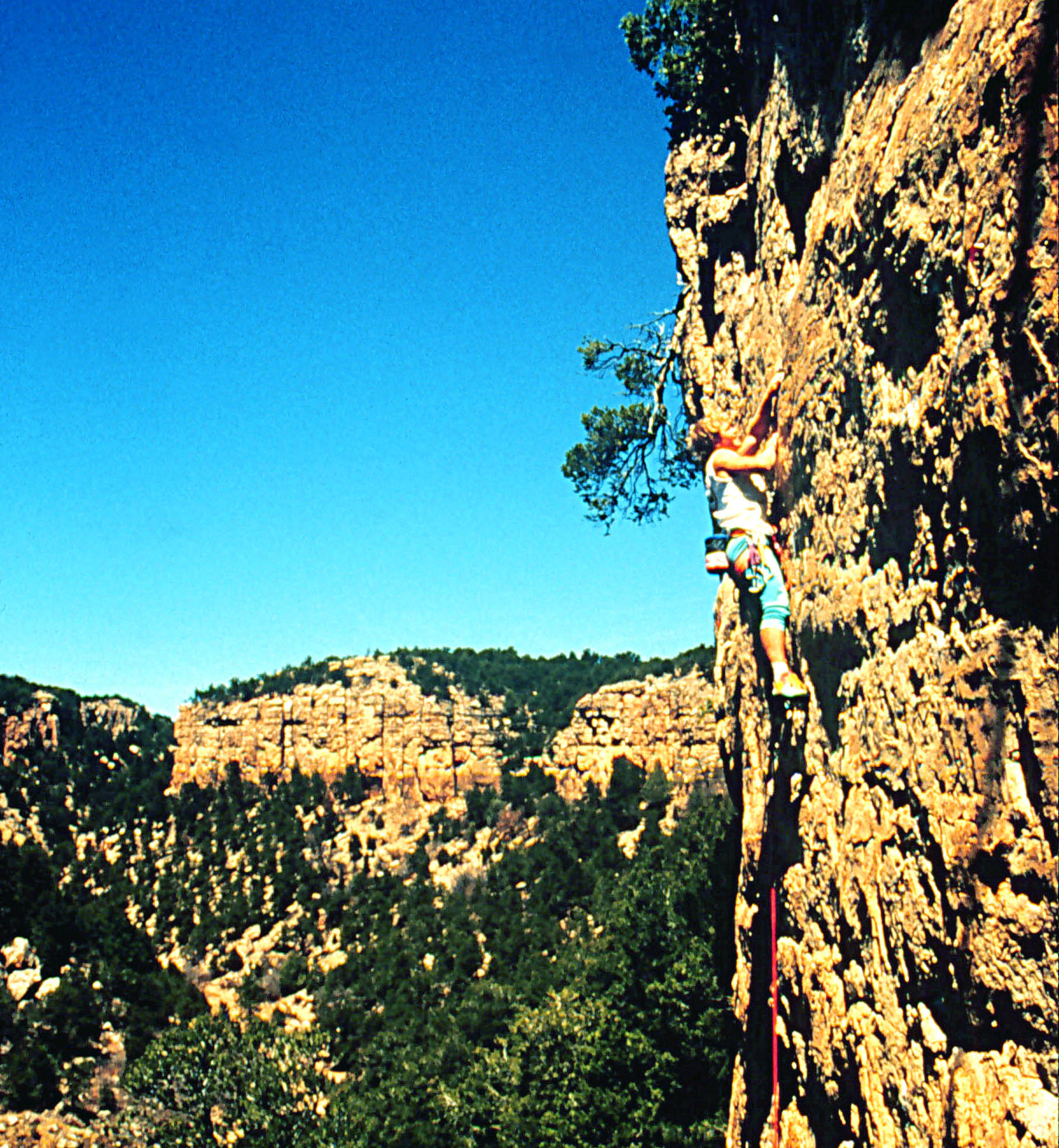
Rock climbing above the Shelf Road

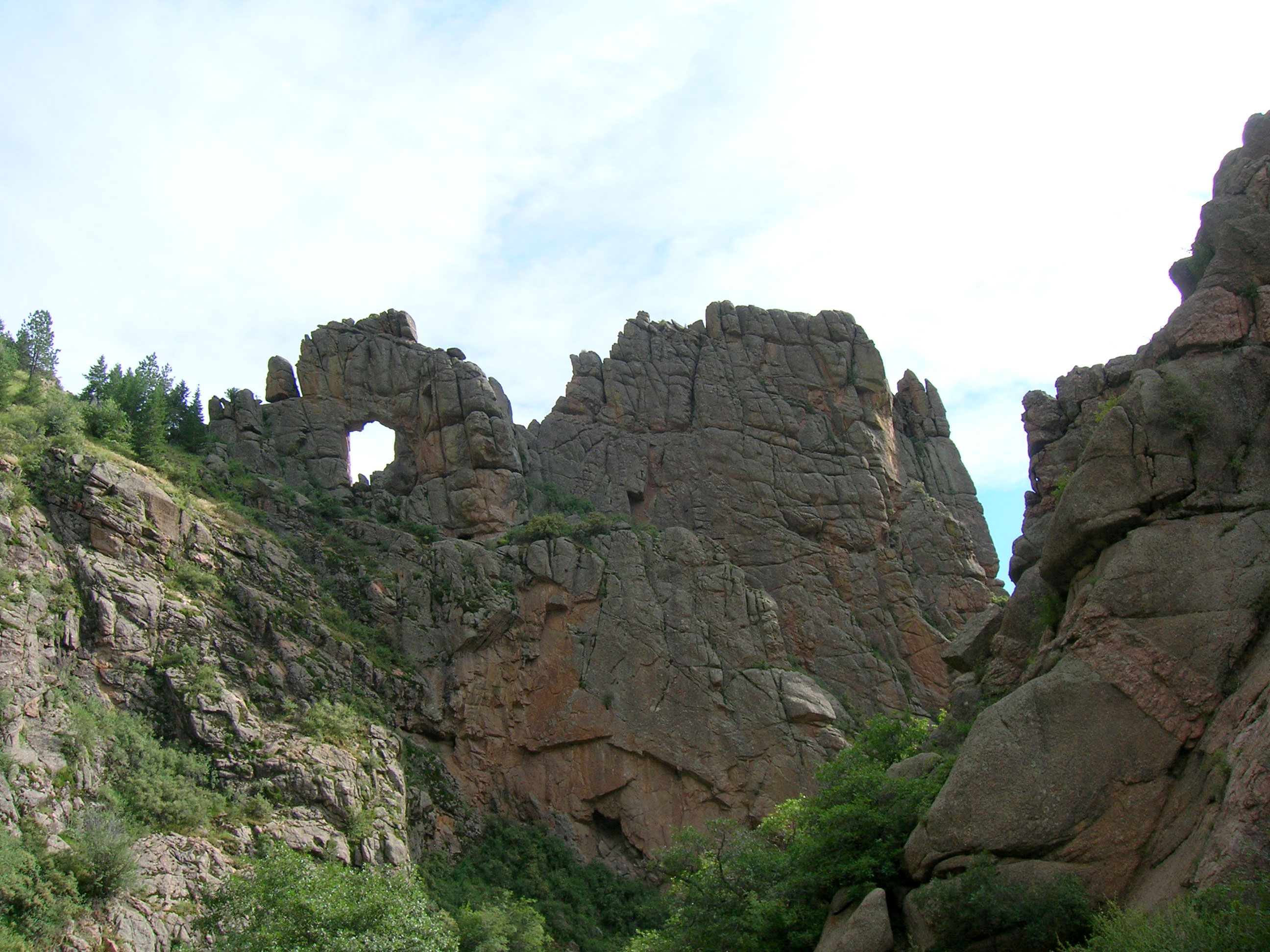
Window Rock along the Shelf Road

== See also ==
- History Colorado
