= Victor Hotel =

Hotel

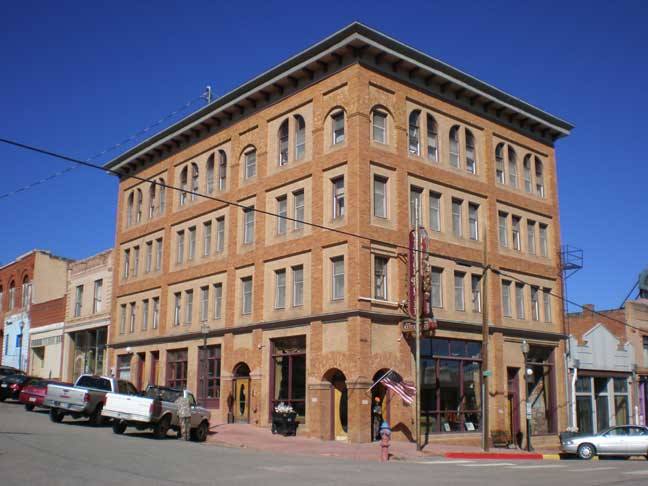
- Interactive map of the Victor Hotel area

General information
- Location: Victor, Colorado, 4th St. & Victor Ave. Victor, CO 80860
- Opening: 1900, 1992
- Closed: 1960s, (open)
- Owner: Victor Hotel Limited Liability Company

Technical details
- Floor count: 4

Other information
- Number of rooms: 20

Website
- http://www.victorhotelcolorado.com
- Victor Hotel
- U.S. National Register of Historic Places
- Location within Colorado Location within the United States
- Location: 4th Street and Victor Avenue, Victor, Colorado
- Coordinates: 38°42′38″N 105°8′26″W
- Area: less than one acre
- Built: 1899
- Architectural style: Italianate
- NRHP reference No.: 80000929
- Added to NRHP: April 10, 1980

The Victor Hotel is a historic hotel in the mining town of Victor, Colorado in the United States. The hotel is a four-story Victorian brick building built in 1899-1900 by the town's founders, the Woods brothers. It is on the National Register of Historic Places.

== History ==
=== Gold Coin Mine ===
Frank and Harry Woods (Note: Harry and Frank Woods arrived in the Victor area in 1892 with their father Warren Woods. Warren, born in Ohio in 1834, "was the president of most of the Woods' enterprises." Frank managed the Woods Investment Company operations. Harry was a newspaper man before moving to Colorado; He was born in Illinois in 1859. In addition to the Gold Coin Mine and the Victor Bank Block, the Woods also owned or invested in the Pikes Peak Power Company, Golden Crescent Water and Light Company and the First National Bank of Victor. The power company sold power to Pueblo, Cripple Creek and Victor. In 1927 their "empired ended".) owned land at 4th Street and Victor Avenue where they intended to construct a building. In March 1894, they broke ground and were excavating when then found a body of rich ore. Their building construction efforts halted and they opened the Gold Coin Mine. In August 1899 the entire business district was destroyed in a fire. The original wooden Hotel Victor, which was located across the street from the present hotel, was leveled, and the shaft house at the current Victor Hotel location was also leveled in the fire.

The tunnels of the Gold Coin Mine ran under the Victor business district and a total of $6 million in gold was extracted from the mine. Reputedly "one of its depositors mined directly beneath the bank at five hundred feet from the surface."

=== Victor Bank building ===
The Woods brothers had the four-story Victor Bank building constructed in 1899; It was completed on December 24, 1899. The Bank Block building was representative of turn-of-the-century commercial buildings. The Italianate structure with bays, large storefront windows and cornice work is the largest building in Victor. When it opened it held the Woods brothers' bank, First National Bank of Victor, lodging rooms, and consulting and retail businesses. The Woods had a reversal of fortunes. Bank examiners found that the bank was insolvent and closed it on November 4, 1903. The Woods brothers then sold the building. A subsequent bank in the building was the Citizen's Bank of Victor. It was once considered the most modern edifice in the Cripple Creek District.

Businesses in the building included Western Union Telegraph Company, H.H. Rosser and the Colorado Telephone Company. Businessmen who operated within the building included Dr. H.G. Thomas, father of Lowell Thomas, J.W. Huff, Dean Merrill Bodwell, and J.E. Ferguson.

A.E. Carlton bought the Bank Building and owned and operated the City Bank. A hospital was operated on the fourth floor by 1906 and, during a difficult winter, also functioned as a morgue. The offices on the second and third store remained. Two of the businesses in the building in 1908 were a jewelry and grocery store.

The City Bank closed during the depression. Bill Lehr's photography studio and the Brass Rail Café and Bar were located on the first floor in the 1930s. Reindel's soda fountain, Henry Munsted's gift shop and a restaurant did business in the building in the mid-1950s and early 1960s. In the 1960s businesses in the building closed, the building was vacant and became dilapidated over the next two decades.

In October 1991, the property was purchased by the Victor Hotel Limited Liability Company. Marjoe D. Bandimere of Arvada, Colorado supervised the renovation with the intention of preserving the historic integrity of the building and providing modern conveniences. Some of the historic elements included the bird cage elevator, bank vault, original woodwork, and the steam radiators, which were outfitted with individual thermostat controls. In August 1992, the renovation was completed.

Victor Hotel provides lodging to visitors, with modern amenities such as private baths, wireless internet, telephones and cable television. The bird cage elevator, the oldest operating elevator in Colorado, is still operational. A restaurant is located in the lobby of the hotel.

== Legends ==
For a period of time, the hotel operated as a boarding house for miners. A miner named Eddy, who lived in room 301, left his room and pressed the button to call the elevator. The iron gates opened, but the elevator car had not arrived. Unaware, Eddy stepped inside the elevator shaft and "fell to his death." Based upon reports of Eddy's visitations, ghost hunters request to sleep in his room.

== See also ==
- National Register of Historic Places listings in Teller County, Colorado
