= Florissant, Colorado =

Census-designated place in Teller County, Colorado, United States

- Census-designated place
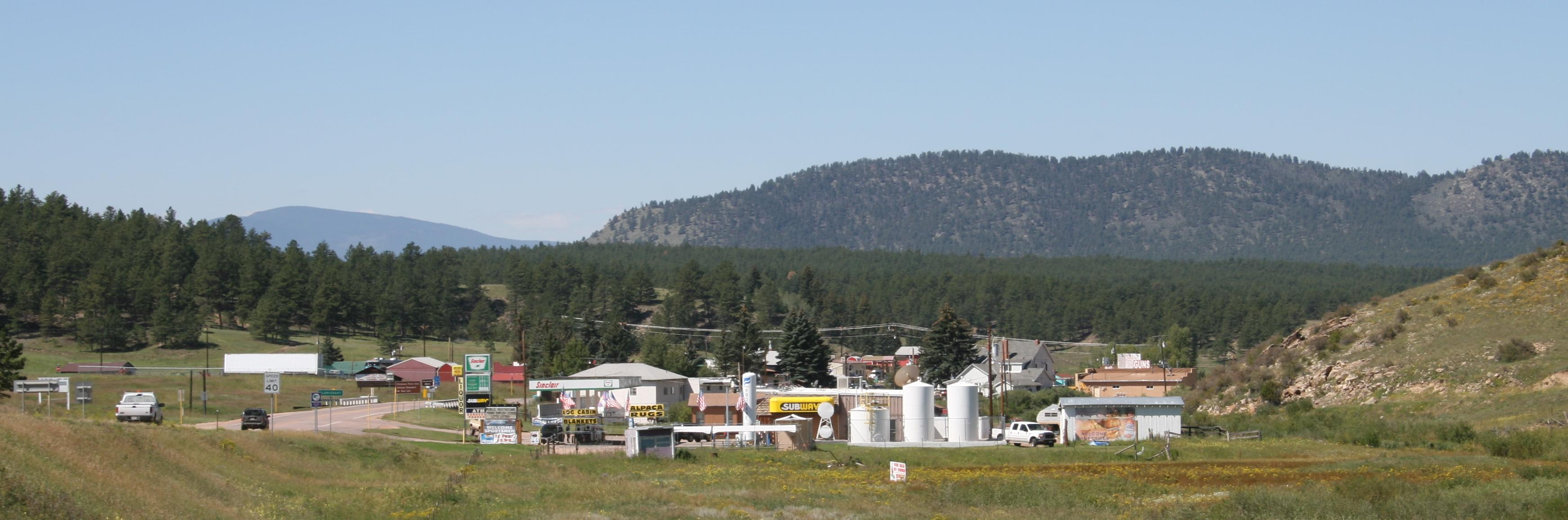
- Panorama of Florissant.

- Location of the Florissant CDP in Teller County, Colorado
- Coordinates: 38°56′40″N 105°17′24″W
- Country: United States
- State: Colorado
- County: Teller
- Established: 1870

Government
  - Type: Unincorporated community
  - Body: Teller County

Area
  - Total: 0.516 sq mi (1.336 km^{2})
  - Land: 0.516 sq mi (1.336 km^{2})
  - Water: 0 sq mi (0.000 km^{2})
- Elevation: 8,173 ft (2,491 m)

Population (2020)
  - Total: 128
  - Density: 200/sq mi (78/km^{2})
- Time zone: UTC−07:00 (MST)
  - Summer (DST): UTC−06:00 (MDT)
- ZIP code: 80816
- Area code: 719
- GNIS feature: 2583235
- FIPS code: 27095

Florissant is an unincorporated community, a post office, and a census-designated place (CDP) located in and governed by Teller County, Colorado, United States. The CDP is a part of the Colorado Springs, CO Metropolitan Statistical Area. The Florissant post office has the ZIP Code 80816. At the United States Census 2020, the population of the Florissant CDP was 128, while the population of the 80816 ZIP Code Tabulation Area was 5,180 including adjacent areas.

== History ==
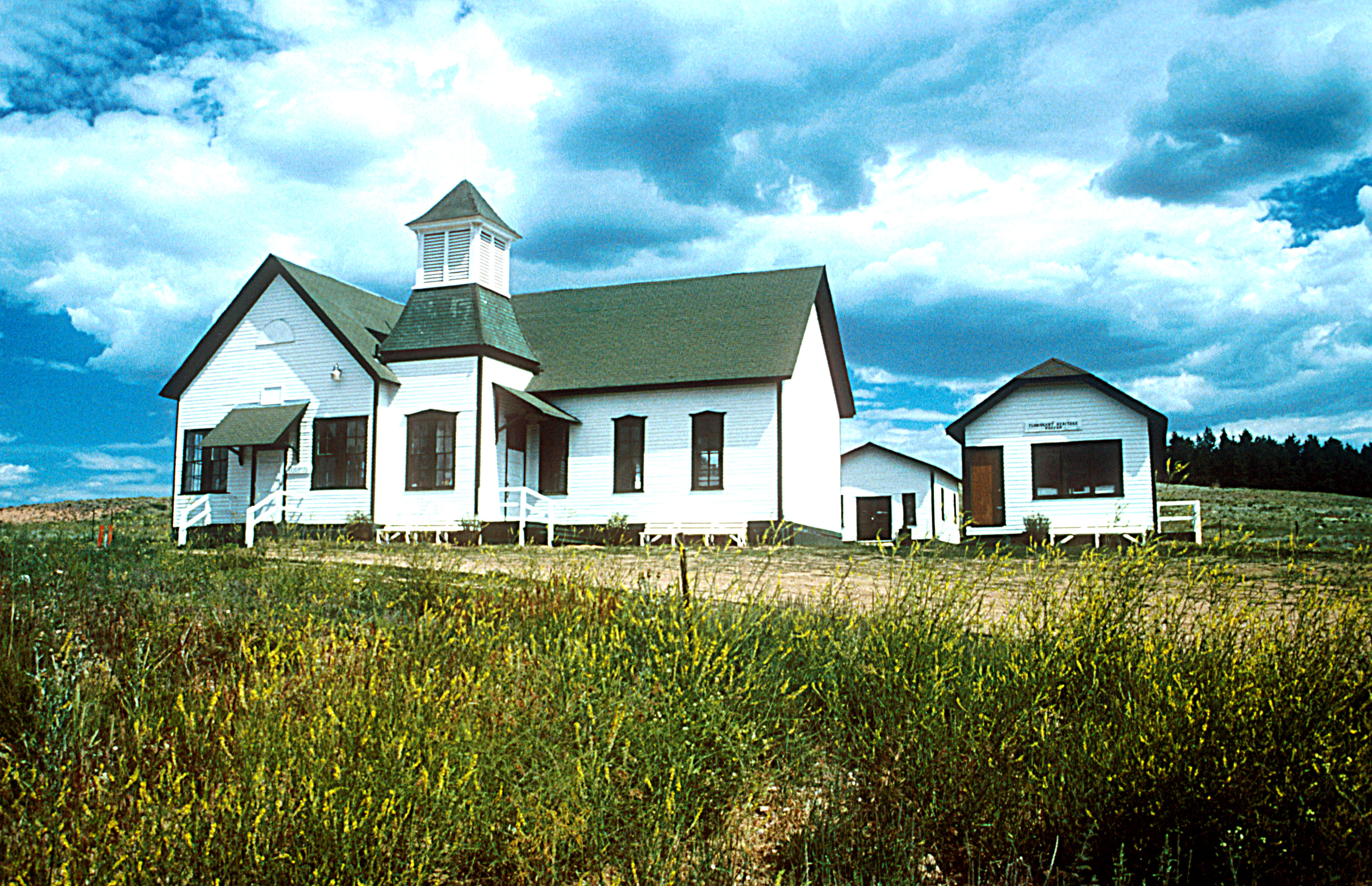
Florissant Heritage Museum

The Florissant, Colorado Territory, post office opened on November 20, 1872. Florissant, Colorado, was named after Florissant, Missouri, the hometown of Judge James Castello, an early settler. The word florissant is the gerund of the French verb fleurir, which roughly means to flourish, to flower, or to blossom.

== Geography ==
Florissant is located in western Teller County immediately north of Florissant Fossil Beds National Monument.

At the 2020 United States Census, the Florissant CDP had an area of 330 acres (1.336 km^{2}), all of it land.

=== Climate ===
Climate data for Florissant Fossil Beds National Monument, Colorado (1991–2020 normals, extremes 1988–present)
Month	Jan	Feb	Mar	Apr	May	Jun	Jul	Aug	Sep	Oct	Nov	Dec	Year
Record high °F (°C)	61 (16)	62 (17)	70 (21)	79 (26)	86 (30)	90 (32)	92 (33)	89 (32)	87 (31)	77 (25)	71 (22)	60 (16)	92 (33)
Mean maximum °F (°C)	52.1 (11.2)	53.1 (11.7)	61.2 (16.2)	68.3 (20.2)	76.2 (24.6)	84.2 (29.0)	86.1 (30.1)	82.9 (28.3)	79.0 (26.1)	72.3 (22.4)	60.6 (15.9)	52.7 (11.5)	86.8 (30.4)
Mean daily maximum °F (°C)	39.4 (4.1)	41.3 (5.2)	49.2 (9.6)	55.5 (13.1)	64.5 (18.1)	75.0 (23.9)	78.7 (25.9)	75.8 (24.3)	70.6 (21.4)	60.0 (15.6)	47.5 (8.6)	39.0 (3.9)	58.0 (14.4)
Daily mean °F (°C)	22.4 (−5.3)	24.4 (−4.2)	32.1 (0.1)	38.4 (3.6)	46.6 (8.1)	55.8 (13.2)	60.2 (15.7)	58.3 (14.6)	51.9 (11.1)	41.3 (5.2)	30.7 (−0.7)	22.0 (−5.6)	40.3 (4.6)
Mean daily minimum °F (°C)	5.3 (−14.8)	7.5 (−13.6)	15.1 (−9.4)	21.2 (−6.0)	28.7 (−1.8)	36.5 (2.5)	41.7 (5.4)	40.7 (4.8)	33.3 (0.7)	22.7 (−5.2)	13.9 (−10.1)	5.0 (−15.0)	22.6 (−5.2)
Mean minimum °F (°C)	−16.8 (−27.1)	−14.6 (−25.9)	−4.3 (−20.2)	4.5 (−15.3)	16.8 (−8.4)	27.8 (−2.3)	34.9 (1.6)	33.5 (0.8)	22.1 (−5.5)	3.9 (−15.6)	−8.3 (−22.4)	−17.0 (−27.2)	−22.0 (−30.0)
Record low °F (°C)	−28 (−33)	−34 (−37)	−29 (−34)	−12 (−24)	2 (−17)	14 (−10)	22 (−6)	27 (−3)	12 (−11)	−16 (−27)	−31 (−35)	−30 (−34)	−34 (−37)
Average precipitation inches (mm)	0.45 (11)	0.41 (10)	0.91 (23)	1.13 (29)	1.59 (40)	1.57 (40)	2.86 (73)	3.03 (77)	1.31 (33)	0.73 (19)	0.54 (14)	0.44 (11)	14.97 (380)
Average snowfall inches (cm)	7.0 (18)	7.7 (20)	11.7 (30)	9.4 (24)	3.8 (9.7)	0.1 (0.25)	0.0 (0.0)	0.0 (0.0)	0.7 (1.8)	4.4 (11)	7.3 (19)	6.8 (17)	58.9 (150)
Average precipitation days (≥ 0.01 in)	3.9	4.7	5.9	6.2	8.5	8.3	12.7	14.1	6.8	4.9	4.0	4.1	84.1
Average snowy days (≥ 0.1 in)	4.4	4.8	5.1	3.8	1.3	0.1	0.0	0.0	0.3	2.0	3.3	4.3	29.4
Source: NOAA

== Demographics ==
The United States Census Bureau initially defined the Florissant CDP for the United States Census 2010.

Florissant CDP, Colorado
Year	Pop.	±%
2010	104	—
2020	128	+23.1%
Source: United States Census Bureau

== Town ==
Florissant is immediately west of the starting point of the Hayman fire, which became the most extensive fire in Colorado history in 2002, until the Pine Gulch Fire surpassed it.

Florissant is served by the Florissant Fire Protection District. The District consists of 2 Fire Stations, 3 Engines, 2 Tenders, 3 Rescue Trucks, and a Mule 4WD off-road vehicle.

Florissant has several subdivisions, including Colorado Mountain Estates, Druid Hills, Florissant Heights, Indian Creek, Wilson Lakes, Valley Hi, and Bear Trap Ranch

== Education ==
It is in the Woodland Park School District RE-2.

== See also ==
- Front Range Urban Corridor
