= Victor, Colorado =

City in Colorado, United States

City of Victor, Colorado
- Statutory City
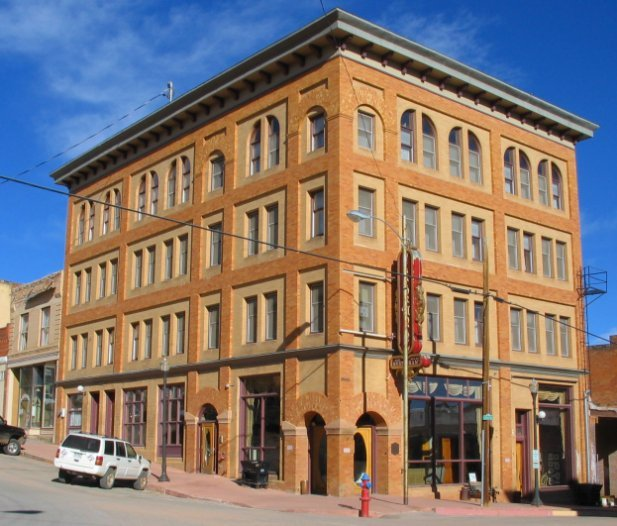
- The Victor Hotel.
- Nickname: "City of Gold Mines"
- Location of the City of Victor in Teller County, Colorado
- Coordinates: 38°42′36″N 105°08′24″W
- Country: United States
- State: Colorado
- County: Teller County
- City: Victor
- Founded: 1891
- Incorporated: July 16, 1894

Government
  - Type: Statutory city

Area
  - Total: 0.29 sq mi (0.74 km^{2})
  - Land: 0.29 sq mi (0.74 km^{2})
  - Water: 0 sq mi (0.00 km^{2})
- Elevation: 9,708 ft (2,959 m)

Population (2020)
  - Total: 379
  - Density: 1,300/sq mi (510/km^{2})
- Time zone: UTC-7 (Mountain (MST))
  - Summer (DST): UTC-6 (MDT)
- ZIP code: 80860
- Area code: 719
- FIPS code: 08-80865
- GNIS feature ID: 204771
- Website: Official website

The City of Victor is a Statutory City in Teller County, Colorado, United States. Gold was discovered in Victor in the late 19th century, an omen of the future of the town. With Cripple Creek, the mining district became the second largest gold mining district in the country and realized approximately $10 billion of mined gold in 2010 dollars. It reached its peak around the turn of the century when there were about 18,000 residents in the town. Depleted ore in mines, labor strife and the exodus of miners during World War I caused a steep decline in the city's economy, from which it has never recovered.

The population was 379 at the 2020 census. There is a resumed mining effort on Battle Mountain.

== History ==
=== Gold discovery ===
Victor was founded in 1891, shortly after Winfield Scott Stratton discovered gold nearby. The town was named after the Victor Mine, which may have been named for an early settler, Victor Adams. In 1892, Harry, Frank and Warren Woods founded the Mt. Rosa Mining, Milling and Land Company. (Note: Harry and Frank Woods arrived in the Victor area in 1892 with their father Warren Woods. Warren, born in Ohio in 1834, "was the president of most of the Woods' enterprises." Frank managed the Woods Investment Company operations. Harry was a newspaper man before moving to Colorado; he was born in Illinois in 1859. In addition to the Gold Coin Mine and the Victor Bank Block, the Woods also owned or invested in the Pikes Peak Power Company, Golden Crescent Water and Light Company and the First National Bank of Victor. The power company sold power to Pueblo, Cripple Creek and Victor. In 1927, their "empire ended".) Battle Mountain, located just above Victor, had the largest, most prolific mines in the mining district and the town became known as the "City of Mines." Victor officially became a city on July 16, 1894. In 1894, the Woods brothers discovered gold when they began digging the foundation for a building, which resulted in the creation of the Gold Coin Mine. At that time, 8,000 people lived in Victor.

The town boomed as the surrounding Cripple Creek mining district quickly became the most productive gold mining district in Colorado. Mines in Victor and Cripple Creek provided 21 million ounces of gold. In 2010, the value of the gold would have been more than $10 billion. The mining district, which hit its peak in 1900, became the 2nd largest gold district in the country's history.

Although Victor's fame was overshadowed by that of its neighbor, Cripple Creek, many of the best gold mines of the Cripple Creek district were located at Victor, including Stratton's Independence Mine and Mill and the Portland Mine. Half of Battle Mountain's gold was extracted by the Portland Mine, which was called the "Queen of the District". Heavyweight boxing champion William Harrison "Jack" Dempsey was a mucker in the Portland Mine.

Mine owners and investors lived in Cripple Creek, while most of the miners for the districts' 500 mines lived in Victor.

=== Fire of 1899 ===
In August 1899, the business district was destroyed in a five-hour fire. The town had about 18,000 residents at the time. As a result, many of the historic buildings date to 1899, including the St. Victor Roman Catholic church, the First Baptist Church of Victor, and the Victor Hotel.

=== Unionized workforce ===
The Western Federation of Miners (WFM) began to organize workers in a fight for shorter work days and standard wages. The workforce became heavily unionized after the Western Federation of Miners conducted a significant strike in 1894. A subsequent strike in 1903 had such an impact that it came to be called the Colorado Labor Wars. At this point, the amount of available ore to mine had declined significantly and mining in the district was further impacted by slow production as the result of violent strikes.

The WFM's union hall in Victor still stands, with telltale bullet holes left intact. The building has structural problems and needs renovation.

=== Mining decline ===
The town declined steadily in the 20th century, as the gold mines became worked out, and the cost of mining rose relative to the price of gold (fixed at $20.67/troy ounce). Area miners enlisted during World War I, and the loss of workers created a steep decline in mining activity from which the area has not recovered.

Gold mining increased in 1934 when the federal government raised the price of gold to $34/ounce, but gold mining was shut down during World War II as nonessential to the war effort. Some mines opened after the war, but all mines in the district closed by 1962.

=== Resumed mining activity ===
The Cripple Creek & Victor Gold Mining Company formed in 1976 as a joint venture to restart mining in the district. From 1976 to 1989, the company produced 150,000 troy ounces (4,600 kg) of gold by reprocessing tailings and mining two small surface deposits. The Cripple Creek & Victor Gold Mining Company began the first large-scale open pit mining in the district in 1994. In 1995, an open pit gold mining operation, which taps into "legendary" mines, began on Battle Mountain. The Cresson mine open pits are located a few miles north of Victor. Mining continues at the Cripple Creek & Victor Gold Mine, under the ownership of AngloGold Ashanti, producing about 250,000 troy ounces of gold in 2012, in addition to several locally owned mines, all of which provide employment and revenue for the community. Ownership has recently changed from Anglo Gold to Newmont Mining.

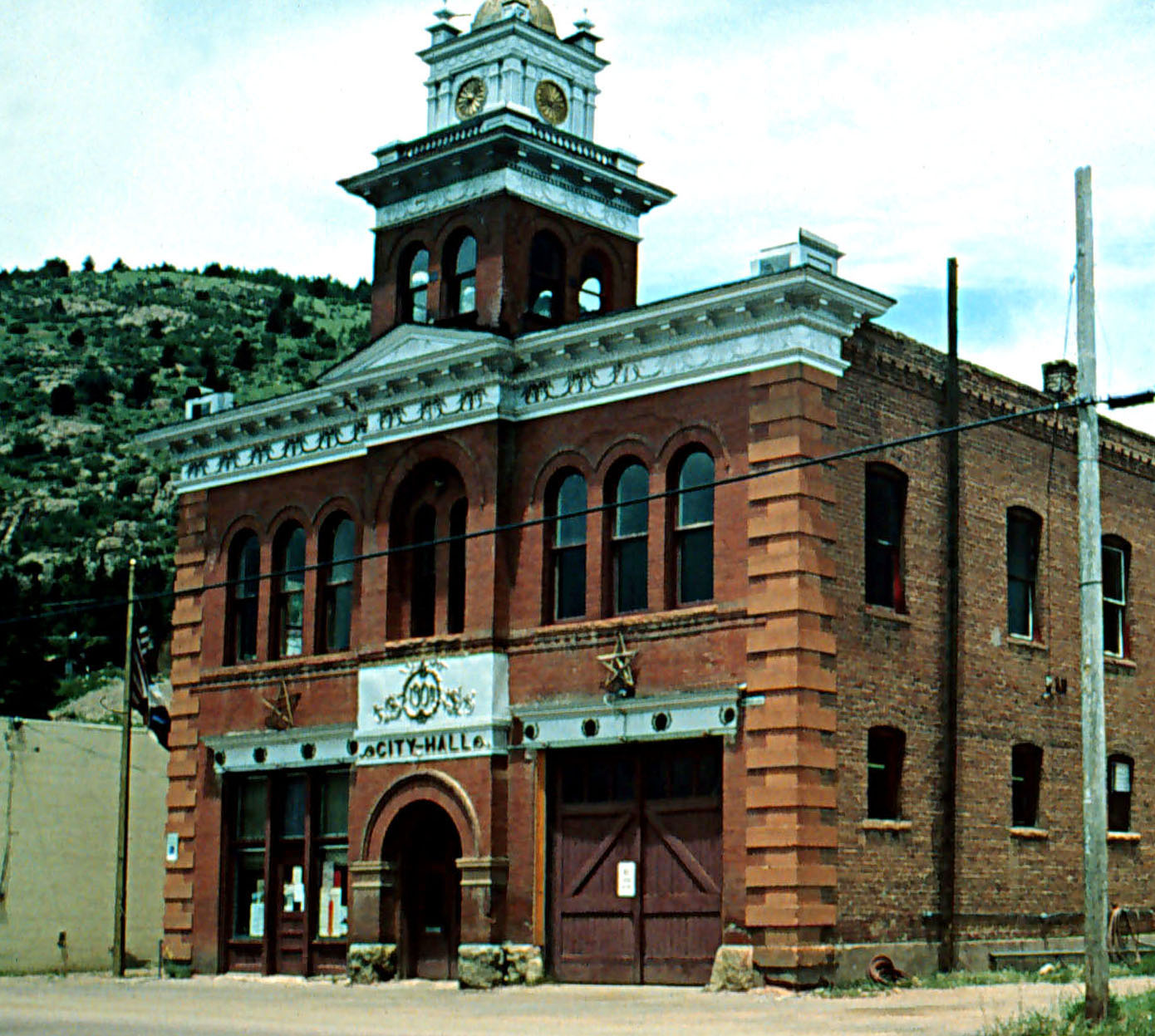
The Victor City Hall is one of several historic buildings that have been restored in downtown Victor.

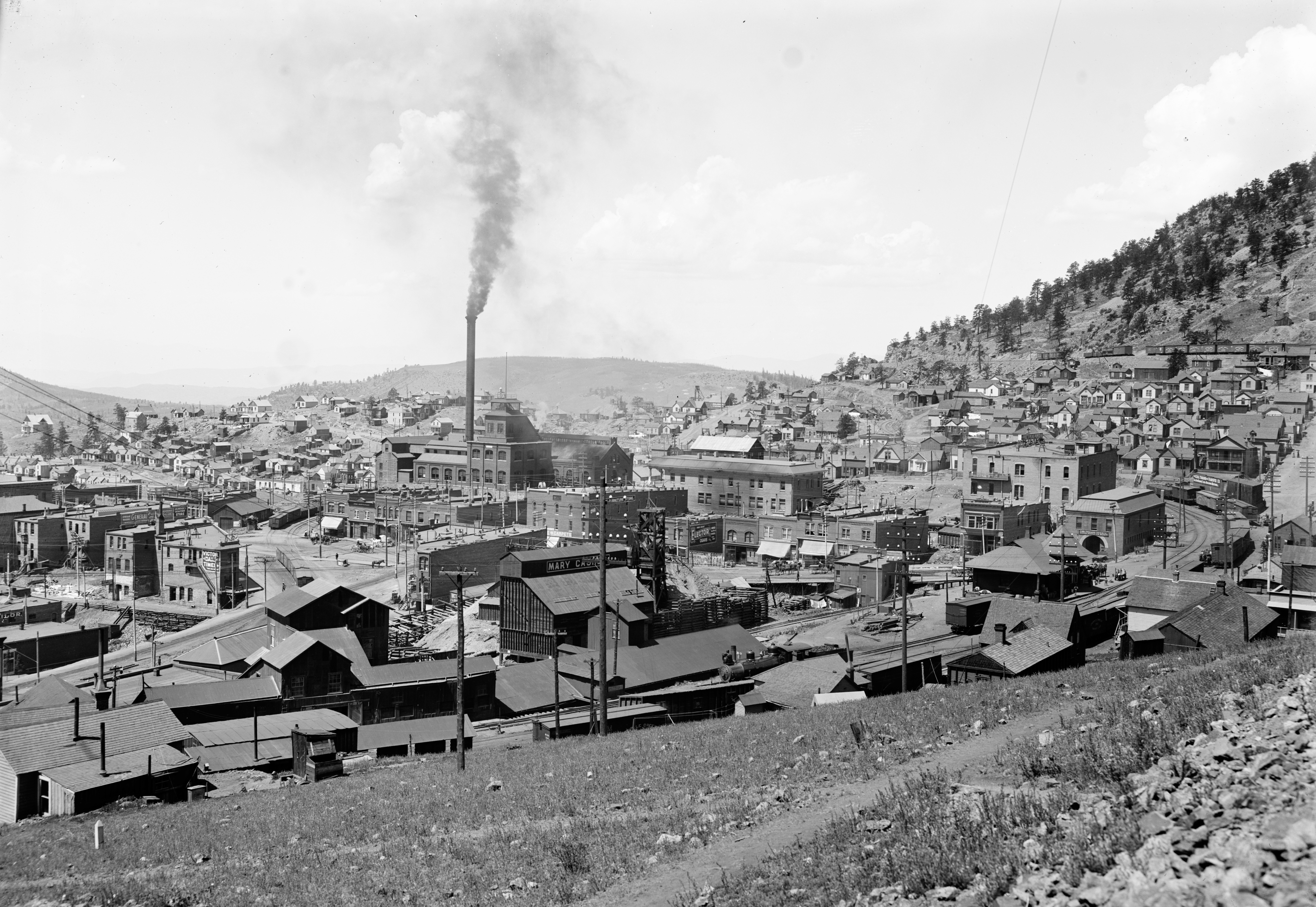
Gold mine in Victor, Colorado, around 1900

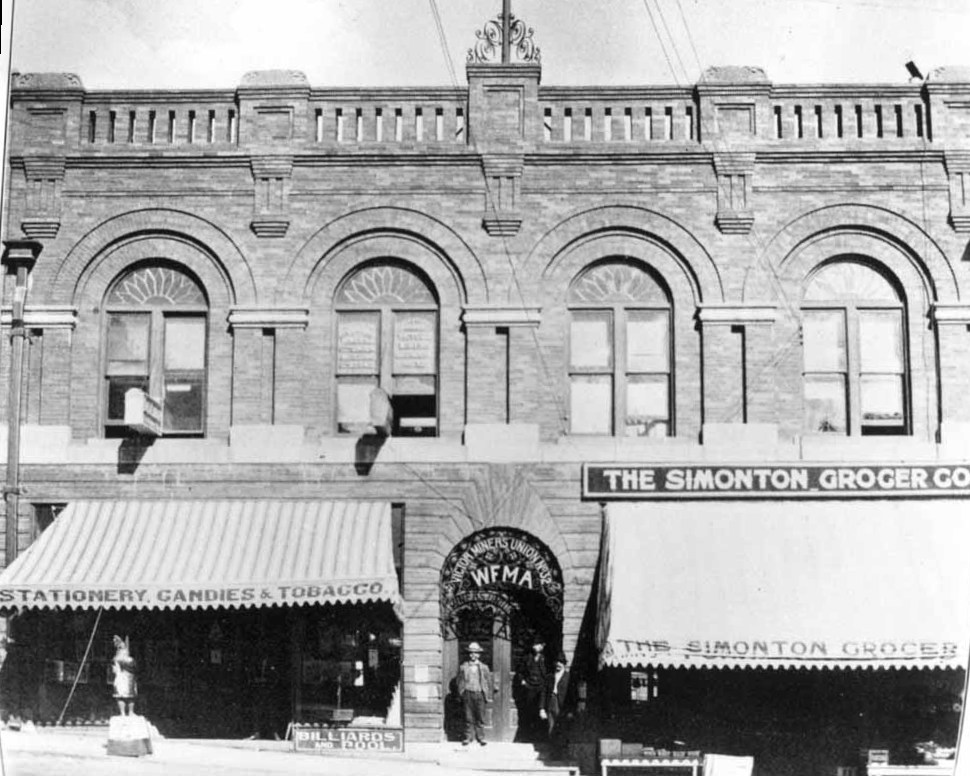
Western Federation of Miners union hall

== Geography ==
According to the United States Census Bureau for 2010, the city has a total area of 0.27 square miles (0.70 km^{2}), all of it land.

== Climate ==
Victor experiences a humid continental climate (Koppen: Dfb), bordering on subalpine (Dfc). Summers are very mild, while winters are relatively cold.

Climate data for Victor, Colorado
Month	Jan	Feb	Mar	Apr	May	Jun	Jul	Aug	Sep	Oct	Nov	Dec	Year
Record high °F (°C)	57 (14)	62 (17)	68 (20)	72 (22)	77 (25)	84 (29)	92 (33)	83 (28)	79 (26)	77 (25)	66 (19)	63 (17)	92 (33)
Mean daily maximum °F (°C)	35.1 (1.7)	37.2 (2.9)	40.9 (4.9)	47.2 (8.4)	55.7 (13.2)	66.9 (19.4)	71.1 (21.7)	69.2 (20.7)	64.0 (17.8)	54.2 (12.3)	43.7 (6.5)	35.9 (2.2)	51.8 (11.0)
Mean daily minimum °F (°C)	13.6 (−10.2)	13.8 (−10.1)	17.2 (−8.2)	23.3 (−4.8)	31.7 (−0.2)	41.0 (5.0)	45.5 (7.5)	45.0 (7.2)	38.5 (3.6)	29.4 (−1.4)	21.7 (−5.7)	14.5 (−9.7)	27.9 (−2.3)
Record low °F (°C)	−27 (−33)	−25 (−32)	−14 (−26)	−4 (−20)	10 (−12)	13 (−11)	29 (−2)	25 (−4)	14 (−10)	−4 (−20)	−15 (−26)	−21 (−29)	−27 (−33)
Average precipitation inches (mm)	0.32 (8.1)	0.45 (11)	1.09 (28)	1.20 (30)	1.77 (45)	1.65 (42)	4.90 (124)	3.88 (99)	1.55 (39)	0.91 (23)	0.58 (15)	0.56 (14)	18.86 (479)
Average snowfall inches (cm)	5.5 (14)	8.1 (21)	15.2 (39)	12.4 (31)	7.0 (18)	0.5 (1.3)	0 (0)	0 (0)	2.4 (6.1)	8.4 (21)	8.4 (21)	8.0 (20)	75.8 (193)
Source: The Western Regional Climate Center

== Demographics ==
Historical population
Census	Pop.	Note	%±
1900	4,986		—
1910	3,162		−36.6%
1920	1,777		−43.8%
1930	1,291		−27.3%
1940	1,784		38.2%
1950	684		−61.7%
1960	434		−36.5%
1970	258		−40.6%
1980	265		2.7%
1990	258		−2.6%
2000	445		72.5%
2010	397		−10.8%
2020	379		−4.5%

As of the census of 2010, there were 397 people, 212 households, and 103 families residing in the city. The population density was 1,635.8 inhabitants per square mile (631.6/km^{2}). There were 360 housing units at an average density of 1,323.3 per square mile (510.9/km^{2}). The racial makeup of the city was 91.9% White, 0.5% African American, 2.5% Native American, 0.5% Asian, 2.8% from other races, and 1.8% from two or more races. Hispanic or Latino of any race were 7.8% of the population.

There were 212 households, out of which 12.7% had children under the age of 18 living with them, 37.7% were married couples living together, 8.0% had a female householder with no husband present, and 51.4% were non-families. 16.5% of all households had individuals under 18, and 19.8% had someone living alone who was 65 years of age or older. The average household size was 1.87 and the average family size was 2.55.

In the city, the population was spread out, with 17.6% under the age of 19, 4.8% from 20 to 24, 20.6% from 25 to 44, 47.8% from 45 to 64, and 11.1% who were 65 years of age or older. The median age was 49.3 years. For every 100 females, there were 105.7 males. For every 100 females age 18 and over, there were 105.4 males.

The median income for a household in the city was $31,250, and the median income for a family was $34,375. Males had a median income of $38,750 versus $17,019 for females. The per capita income for the city was $17,242. About 14.0% of families and 18.4% of the population were below the poverty line, including 31.7% of those under age 18 and 5.0% of those age 65 or over.

== Arts and culture ==
=== Museums and other points of interest ===
Victor is in the heart of Colorado's gold country, home to two of the major gold mines in the Cripple Creek mining district. Though the goldrush-era mines are closed, near the center of town the fortress-like remains of a wrought iron-gated mine entrance, shaft elevators (which carried the miners down), mine carts (now employed by the town as flower planters), barred tunnels, two outbuildings (an office overlooking the entrance and the building from which the miners set out), and other sites of interest from that era still stand. Several towering 'gallows frames', which house the antique elevator pulleys, can be seen on the hillsides. Victor has many mining and history related attractions:

- Gold Coin Mine
- Lowell Thomas Museum
- Victor Hotel
- Victor Downtown Historic District, including the active First Baptist Church

Victor also lies along the Gold Belt Tour National Scenic and Historic Byway.

=== Arts festival ===
"Victor Celebrates the Arts" is a judged painting contest held on Labor Day weekend, which began in 2000.

=== Photography book ===
A 2015 book, City of Mines, by Anderson & Low (ISBN 978-1907893773), depicts the buildings and scenery around the town without showing the people.

=== World Record Home Run Distance Attempt ===
In 2022, youtubers The Baseball Bat Bros attempted to break the Guinness World Record for Longest home run hit, set by Babe Ruth in 1921 with a verified measurement of 575 feet. The attempt was made at The Gold Bowl baseball and soccer field. Victor, having one of the highest elevations in the United States was an ideal location as thinner air at high elevations creates less drag on a traveling baseball than at lower elevations, thus allowing it to travel farther in the air. Various high school, college, and former professional baseball players were invited to attempt to break the record but none were successful with elevated land beyond the outfield and unfavorable winds likely spoiling the attempts. The longest home run hit on the day was an estimated 534 feet.

== Education ==
Students are served by the Cripple Creek-Victor School District RE-1. This district operates Cripple Creek-Victor Junior/Senior High School.

== See also ==
- Cripple Creek and Victor Narrow Gauge Railroad
- Gold Belt Tour National Scenic and Historic Byway
- Victor Downtown Historic District
