= Julie Penrose =

American philanthropist

Julia (Julie) Villiers Lewis McMillan Penrose
- Born: Julia Villiers Lewis; 1870; Detroit, Michigan
- Died: January 23, 1956 (aged 85–86); Colorado Springs, Colorado, U.S.
- Occupation: philanthropist
- Spouses: James McMillan (m. 1890; died 1902) Spencer Penrose (m. 1906; died 1939)
- Children: 1

Julia (Julie) Villiers Lewis McMillan Penrose (1870–1956) was a wealthy American philanthropist born to a prominent family, the wife of the James (Jim) McMillan until he died in 1902, then the wife of millionaire Spencer Penrose until his death in 1939. Julie's giving during her marriages, contributions to the region around her, and the state of Colorado, continued even after death with the creation of the perpetual El Pomar Foundation.

Julie Penrose was buried in the Will Rogers Shrine of the Sun along with her husband and two friends.

== Life ==
Julie was born in 1870 to a wealthy and prominent businessman and former Detroit Mayor Alexander Lewis and his wife Elizabeth Ingersoll. Julie was one of eight children to survive to adulthood.

=== McMillan ===
Julie married James (Jim) McMillan in 1890 and they had two children. Gladys was born in 1892 and James II (Jimmy) was born in 1894. Jim contracted tuberculosis in Cuba, during the Spanish-American War, so they moved to Colorado Springs, Colorado, in an attempt to cure him, and purchased a home at 30 West Dale Street. In April 1902, Jimmy died of a ruptured appendix and on May 9, 1902, Jim died. Julie accompanied the caskets to Detroit for burial.

=== Penrose ===
Julie had met Spencer Penrose and they were on the same ship going to Europe. While it is surmised that it was fate, Spencer had written his father seeking permission to marry her. They were in the French Riviera and while Julie was sunbathing Spencer threw Dr. Penrose's letter of consent into her lap as a proposal. On April 26, 1906, Julie married Penrose at St. George's Church in London. The couple returned to Julie's home on 30 West Dale street. Sometimes in January 1916, the couple purchased The Potter estate referred to as the El Pomar Estate (now the Penrose House Conference Center) from Mrs. Grace Goodyear Potter as well as several ranches creating the over 2,000-acre Turkey Creek Ranch.

Spencer is credited for building the Pikes Peak Highway, rebuilding the cog railway, the Broadmoor Hotel, and the Cheyenne Mountain Zoo. Julie with funding Colorado Springs Fine Arts Center and Penrose Memorial Hospital among others.

Spencer died December 7, 1939. Julie moved into the 6th floor of The Broadmoor circa 1944 and lived there until 1955.

=== Gladys ===
Gladys McMillan married Count Paul Cornet of Brussels 18 February 1914. She was the mother of Pauline Julie Caroline Marie Ghislaine Cornet of Ways-Ruart. The Pauline Chapel in The Broadmoor Hotel was named in her honor. Her daughter, Baroness Sybille Michele Emilie Marie Ghislaine de Selys Longchamps, is the great-granddaughter of Julie.

== El Pomar Foundation ==
Julie was President of El Pomar Foundation from 1939 to 1955. The foundation funds and has given grants to many non-profit organizations like the Pikes Peak Library District. The Gazette Charities-El Pomar Foundation's Empty Stocking Fund provides funding for 20 health and human service agencies in the Pikes Peak region which includes El Paso and Teller counties.

In 2016 the foundation was a major donor to The Denver Historic News.

== Accomplishments ==
Julie built a Carriage House Museum, a house on Cheyenne Mountain, and the Pauline Memorial Catholic School. She had a home in Central City, funded the revival of the summer opera festival, St. Mary's High School, Fountain Valley School, endowed the Boys Club, and contributed a 3.2 million dollar grant to build the Penrose Hospital. Penrose Elementary in District 11, Colorado Springs is named in honor of the Penrose's. In 2022, she was inducted into the Colorado Women's Hall of Fame.

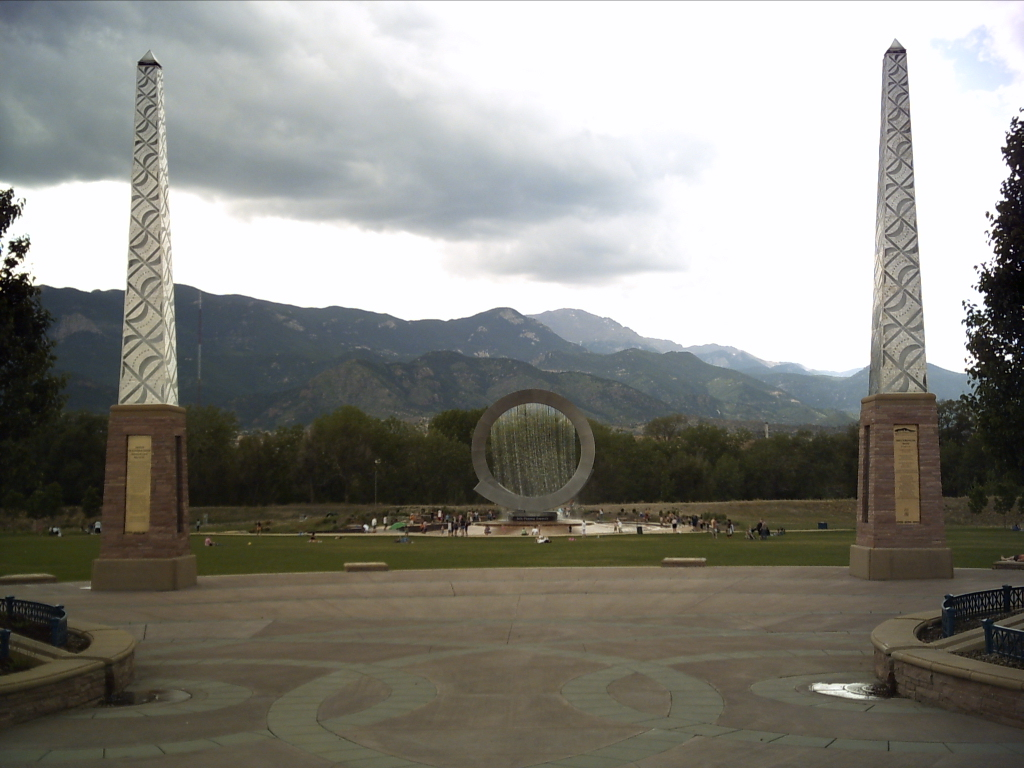
