= El Pomar Estate =

- U.S. National Register of Historic Places
- U.S. Historic district
- Colorado State Register of Historic Properties No. 5EP.377
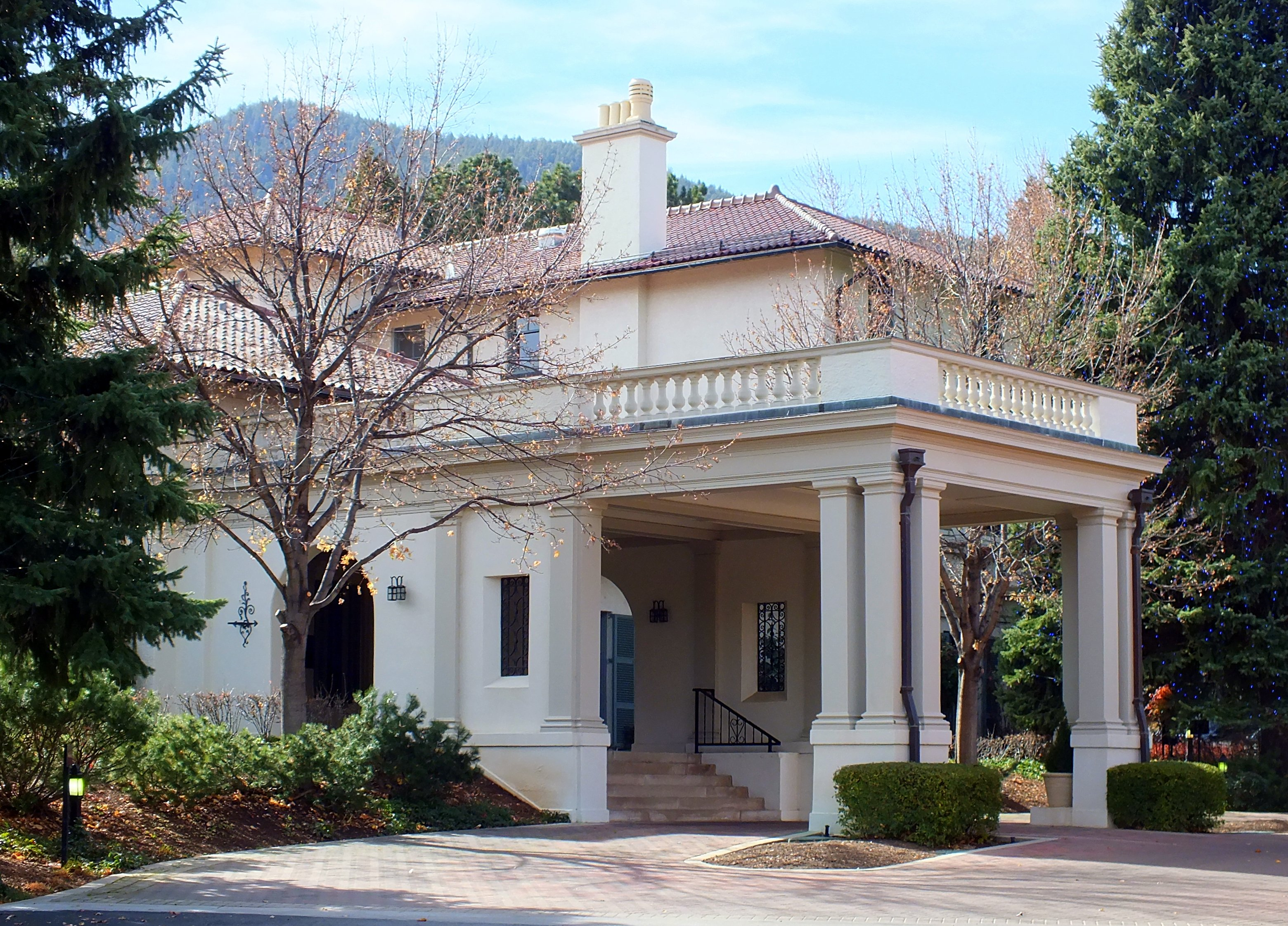
- The Penrose House

- Location within Colorado Location within the United States
- Location: 1661 Mesa Ave., Colorado Springs, Colorado
- Coordinates: 38°47′18″N 104°51′28″W
- Area: 18.4 acres (7.4 ha)
- Built: 1910
- Architect: Horace Trumbauer, Charles Thomas, Thomas MacLaren, the Olmsted Brothers
- Architectural style: Mission Revival and Spanish Revival
- NRHP reference No.: 95001328
- CSRHP No.: 5EP.377

Significant dates
- Added to NRHP: November 22, 1995
- Designated CSRHP: 1995

The El Pomar Estate was the Penrose House and estate of Spencer and Julie Penrose in the Broadmoor, Colorado, Colorado Springs, Colorado It is listed on the National Register of Historic Places listings in El Paso County, Colorado and the Colorado State Register of Historic Properties.

== William F. Dixon ==
Pioneer William F. Dixon, the first to settle in Cheyenne Canon, claimed the land in 1862 for what would be the Dixon Ranch and orchard. He built irrigation ditches for his farm and orchard and raised cattle. A portion of his property that had been apple orchards became the El Pomar estate. (Note: The National Register of Historic Places nomination form for El Pomar states that it was John Dixon that owned the orchard. Several sources, including a Gazette article state that the property was owned by William F. Dixon.)

== The Potter estate ==
In 1909 or 1910, Grace (née Goodyear) Depew built a Spanish style single-story house named El Pomar, Spanish for "the apple orchard". In April 1910, Grace married Captain Ashton Howard Potter. (Note: Grace, the daughter of Frank H. Goodyear of Buffalo, and Ashton Potter met about 1907 in Switzerland. Grace divorced from her husband, Ganson Depew (nephew of U.S. Senator Chauncey Depew), and Potter divorced his wife, Marie Louise McNutt. Potter, the son of Howard Potter and nephew of Bishop Horatio Potter, had served in the military in the Philippines. He played polo in Broadmoor. Grace Potter was considered among the richest women in the United States.) After the couple's relationship became strained, Potter lived in another house on the estate until his death on August 5, 1914. Grace died shortly thereafter on September 12, 1914. Author Julian Street called it the "house of houses" in Colorado Springs, not knowing one in the country that "fits its setting better than this one, or which is more perfect thing from every point of view."

== The Penrose estate ==
Spencer and Julie Penrose purchased El Pomar, the Potter's wine cellar collection, and house furnishings in 1916 for $75,000 (equivalent to $2,219,037 in 2025) near The Broadmoor, a resort that they had built following a European vacation. (Note: The Penrose's Dale Street house in Colorado Springs was donated to the Broadmoor Art Academy by Julie Penrose when they moved to El Pomar. The Broadmoor Art Academy played a key role in the development of the Colorado Springs Fine Arts Center.) They added second and third floors to the house. The estate buildings included the main house, gate lodge, carriage house, gardener's cottage, chauffeur's cottage, and a teahouse. Furnishings purchased or built for the Penroses that remain in El Pomar include Vermont Corona and Belgian black marble, a rare Aeolian organ with ceiling decorations over vents that allowed organ music to drift throughout the house, secret doors that held a wine cellar in the library during Prohibition, and some furnishings.

James Bell, who had been president of the National Association of Gardeners, was superintendent of El Pomar until his death in 1920.

== Sisters of Charity retreat ==
In 1944, following her husband's death in 1939, Julie Penrose moved out of El Pomar and into a penthouse suite at The Broadmoor. She donated the estate to The Sisters of Charity of Cincinnati, who used it as a spiritual retreat center for almost 50 years. Named the Julie Penrose Center, it was the first Catholic retreat center for women west of the Mississippi. It was administered by the Roman Catholic Archdiocese of Denver.

== El Pomar Foundation ==
In 1992, El Pomar became the headquarters for the El Pomar Foundation, founded by Spencer and Julie Penrose in 1937. The foundation initiated a restoration of the estate in 1992 to be used as a conference center, while preserving the integrity of the original architecture. The estate is now the Penrose House Nonprofit Conference and Education Center for non-profit organizations. It has been visited by Margaret Thatcher, Mikhail Gorbachev, and George H. W. Bush, former heads of state.

== See also ==
- National Register of Historic Places listings in El Paso County, Colorado
- History of Colorado Springs, Colorado
