= Cheyenne Mountain Highway =

U.S. State highway in Colorado

- Map of the Cheyenne Mountain Highway in red

Route information
- Maintained by CDOT
- Length: 7.5 mi (12.1 km)

Location
- Country: United States
- State: Colorado

Highway system
- Colorado State Highway System; Interstate; US; State; Scenic

Cheyenne Mountain Highway, otherwise known as Cheyenne Mountain Zoo Road, previously called Wonder Road, is a 7.5 mile- (12.1 km) paved and unpaved highway in the U.S. state of Colorado, at an estimated 3,000 feet in total elevation. The highway begins at a four lane interchange located in El Paso County that includes Penrose Boulevard, Old Stage Road, and West Cheyenne Mountain Boulevard.

It is a private road when traversing pass Cheyenne Mountain Zoo and Will Rogers Shrine of the Sun. It is a paved road up to Cheyenne Mountain Zoo and the Will Rogers Shrine of the Sun. About 5.0 miles (8 km) of the highway is managed and maintained by the Colorado Department of Transportation (CDOT), and is part of the Colorado State Highway System.

After the completion of The Broadmoor; which was planned by Spencer Penrose, Penrose began to develop property that he had purchased on the northern peak of Cheyenne Mountain during 1915. During 1925 Penrose planned and completed 7.5 miles (12.1 km) of a new highway. (Note: The road was 7.5 miles (12.1 km) when it went from Cheyenne Lake at The Broadmoor resort to The Horns. The highway is now 6.7 miles (10.8 km), since the beginning portion of the highway was made into El Pomar Street and Penrose Boulevard.)

Initially called the Broadmoor-Cheyenne Mountain Highway, it began one mile (1.6 km) south of The Broadmoor at the Old Stage Road and ascended to the summit with 32 switchback turns up the mountain, gaining almost 3,000 feet (910 m) in altitude with a maximum 10% grade. It afforded views of Colorado Springs and Pikes Peak.

== Route description ==
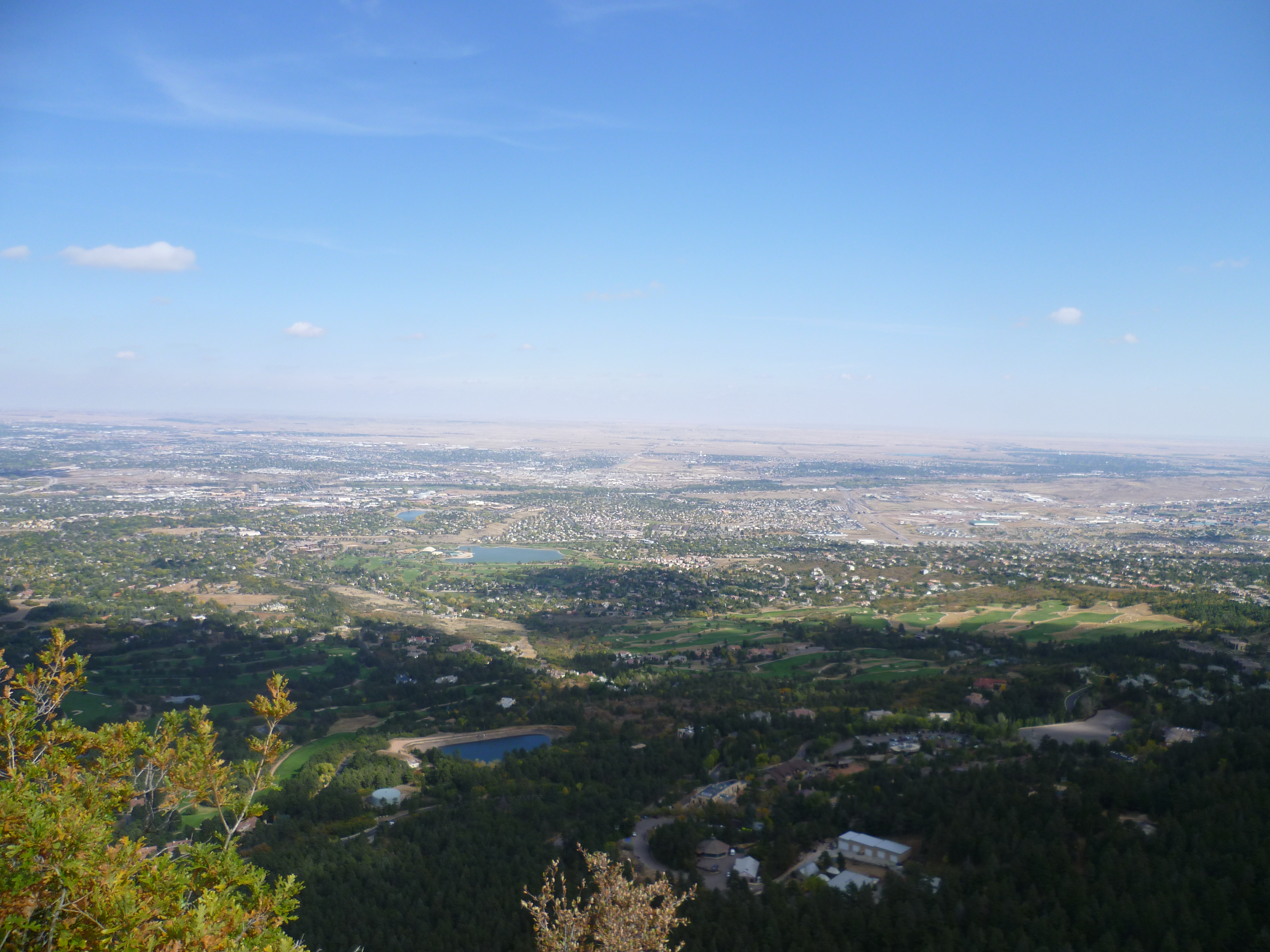
View of Colorado Springs from Will Rogers Shrine of the Sun on Cheyenne Mountain Highway

The road is paved to the Will Rogers Shrine of the Sun, thereafter it is a four-mile-long (6.4 km) unpaved road to The Horns, where The Broadmoor's Cloud Camp is located. This was formerly the site of the Cheyenne Mountain Lodge. There are gates that control the access to the road: two after the Cheyenne Mountain Zoo and a third after the Will Rogers Shrine. The Broadmoor has maintained the road for the transport of guests to Cloud Camp. A portion of the road is named Cheyenne Mountain Zoo Road. The Cheyenne Mountain Highway was originally built for transportation to properties built by Spencer Penrose, which came to include the zoo, the shrine, and the top of the mountain.

== History ==
=== Road to Broadmoor properties ===
Penrose hired Civilian Conservation Corps (CCC) workers to build the unpaved decomposed gravel toll road. In the depressed economy, this provided work for individuals in need of jobs and helped him to manage construction costs. The cost of the construction was $350,000 (equivalent to $6,425,522 in 2025). In 1926, the Cheyenne Mountain Lodge opened at the top of Cheyenne Mountain. (Note: It had a restaurant, a suite for Penrose on the third floor, four guest rooms, and living quarters for servants.) Visitors could make the trip up the highway to the lodge on the backs of elephants, (Note: The lodge, which closed in 1961, is now the site of The Broadmoor's Cloud Camp lodge and cabins.) such as an elephant given to Penrose by an Indian rajah.

The toll gate was situated on the highway just before the Cheyenne Mountain Zoo (1926), and the Will Rogers Shrine of the Sun (1937) was built on the northern promontory of the mountain. The Broadmoor also operated a ski area from 1959-1991 on Cheyenne Mountain, near the Broadmoor Shooting Range. The highway was rebuilt and widened, received several scenic turnouts, and paved with asphaltic concrete following a flood that washed out the road in July 1965. It reopened in April 1966.

=== Cog railroad ===
Penrose opened the original Broadmoor-Cheyenne Mountain Zoo Cog Railroad in June 1938, and Shirley Temple was a passenger on its first run. The train was a replica of the steam trains operated by the Manitou and Pike's Peak Railway (Note: The Gazette's 1950 article, "Cadillac president to pilot inaugural run of cog train, Broadmoor Mountaineer, to zoo", reported that the railroad opened in 1937, but it did not open until June 1938.) In 1950, a "new streamlined" cog train called the Broadmoor Mountaineer was dedicated by Charles L. Tutt, Jr., The Broadmoor's president, and J. F. Gordon, the president of Cadillac Motor Company, who operated the train on its inaugural ride.

Cheyenne Mountain Cog Railroad offered service on a narrow gauge road from The Broadmoor to the Cheyenne Mountain Zoo from 1961 until 1974. The railway engine called The Mountaineer was a small edition of the narrow gauge cog trains used to climb Pikes Peak. Two Plexiglas-topped cars, each carrying up to 20 people, took passengers for a two-mile (3.2 km) ride through four tunnels. The ride began at a boarding station by the lake at The Broadmoor and stopped at the zoo's entrance, the Thundergod House.

== See also ==
- Cheyenne Mountain Air Force Station (NORAD), for NORAD Road
