= Will Rogers Shrine of the Sun =

Commemorative tower and chapel in Colorado Springs, Colorado

- U.S. National Register of Historic Places
- U.S. Historic district
- Colorado State Register of Historic Properties
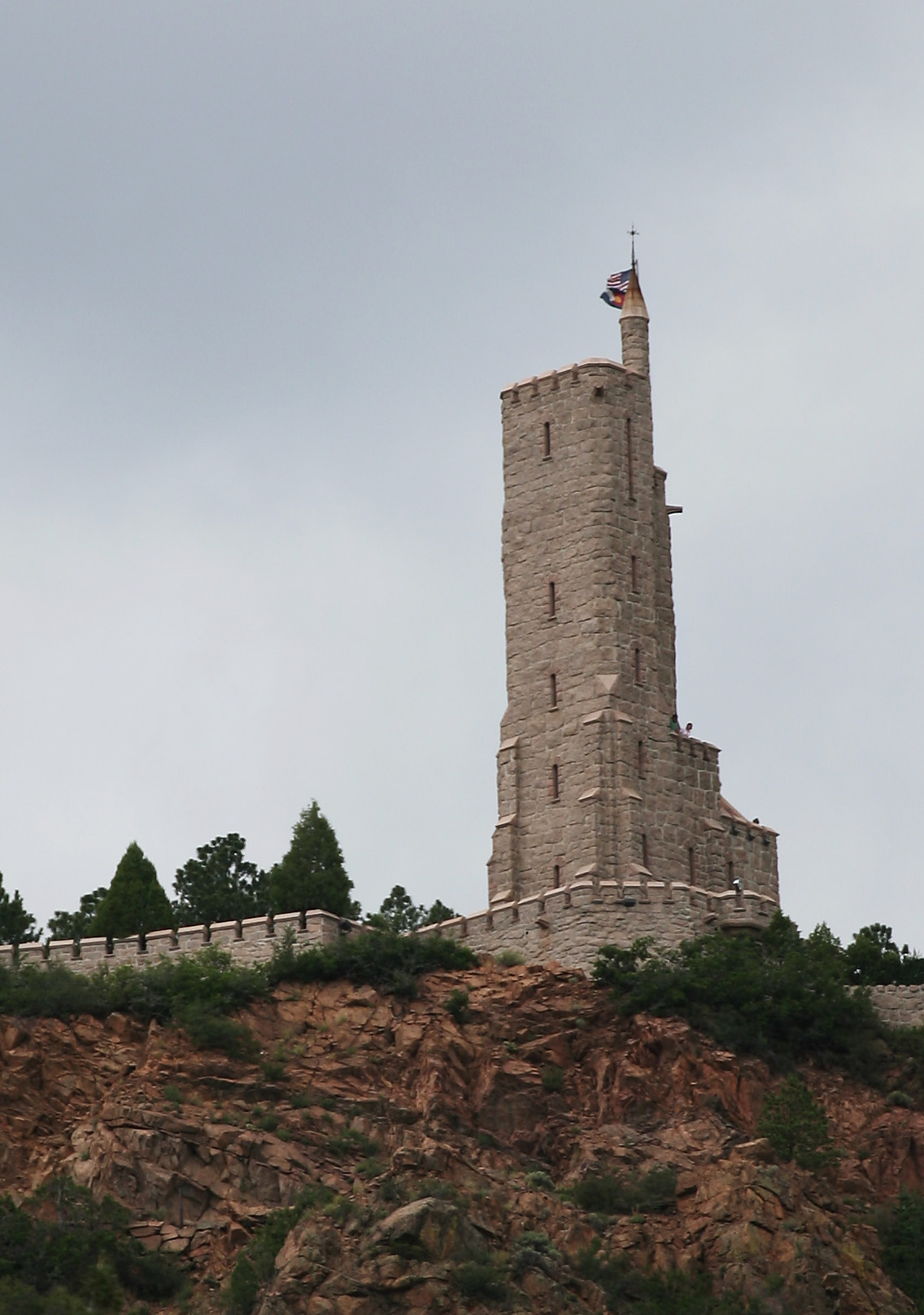

- Location within Colorado Location within the United States
- Location: 4250 Cheyenne Mountain Zoo Road, Colorado Springs, Colorado
- Coordinates: 38°46′20″N 104°51′44″W
- Area: 1.3 acres (0.53 ha)
- Architect: Charles E. Thomas, Randall Davey
- Architectural style: Romanesque
- NRHP reference No.: 94001229
- CSRHP No.: 5EP.2175

Significant dates
- Added to NRHP: November 3, 1994
- Designated CSRHP: November 3, 1994

Will Rogers Shrine of the Sun, also known as Will Rogers Shrine, is a commemorative tower and chapel on Cheyenne Mountain in Colorado Springs, Colorado. It is named after Will Rogers, the American humorist, who died in a plane crash in Alaska in 1935 during construction of the shrine. It is also a tomb for the remains of Spencer Penrose – who built many of the city's prominent properties, including the neighboring Cheyenne Mountain Zoo and The Broadmoor resort – and his wife Julie Penrose. Completed by Penrose in 1937, the shrine is a 100 feet (30 m), five story observation tower that overlooks The Broadmoor, Colorado Springs, and Garden of the Gods.

It was listed on the National Register of Historic Places in 1994 for its artistic and architectural qualities.

== Geography ==
The Will Rogers Shrine of the Sun is located at 8,136 feet (2,480 m) in elevation. It is about 1,500 feet (460 m) in elevation above Colorado Springs, and is also above the Cheyenne Mountain Zoo on the side of Cheyenne Mountain. Views of the Rampart Range, Colorado Springs, and the plains can be seen from the site on a promontory on the mountain, which is accessed via the Cheyenne Mountain Highway. The road to the shrine is restricted at the toll gate to individuals who have purchased Cheyenne Mountain Zoo tickets.

== Description ==
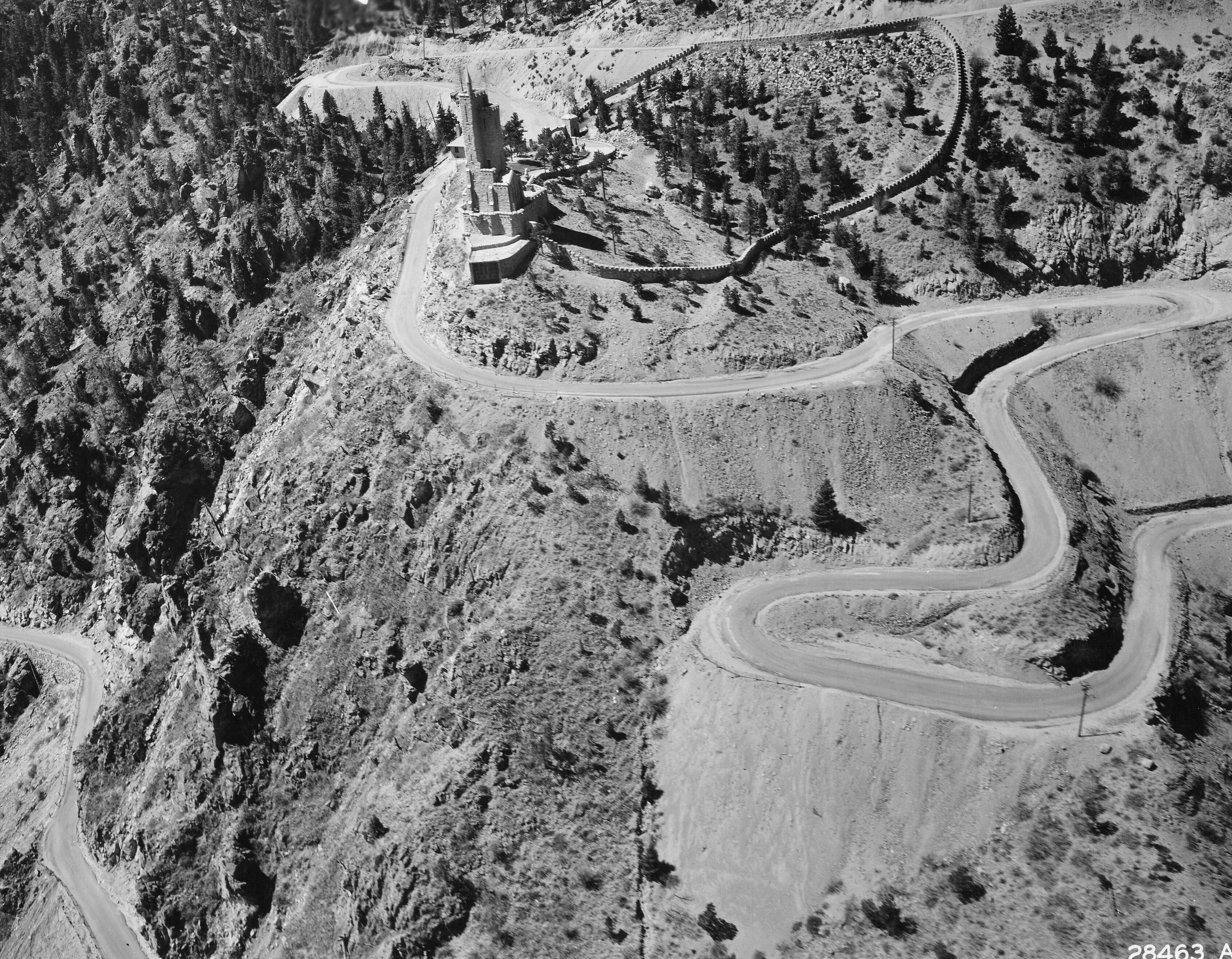
Will Rogers Shrine, 1944

=== Overview ===
The five-story commemorative monument and an adjoining one-story building with the chapel was designed by local architect, Charles E. Thomas, who was hired by Julie and Spencer Penrose, the philanthropist and developer who built The Broadmoor resort and Cheyenne Mountain Zoo. The monument is made of Romanesque Revival architecture with buttresses, an ornately decorated iron and brass door, and narrow leaded windows. It is 100 feet (30 m) tall. (Note: Life states that the shrine is 100 feet (30 m) tall.) The shrine is partly named for the views of the rising and setting sun. Will Rogers, who died in 1935 in an airplane crash, is memorialized in images of his life displayed throughout the interior of the monument and in the name of the shrine. (Note: According to Galas and West, authors of Walking Colorado Springs, Penrose had intended to build the monument before Rogers' death and name it Penrose Memorial, but his friends had dissuaded him from using his name since he wasn't a famous person and therefore the name wouldn't be a commercial draw to vacationers. Due to Penrose's admiration of Will Rogers, the monument was named in his honor.) The shrine is also a memorial to the lives of Julie and Spencer Penrose, whose tombs are in the monuments lower level. The Pikes Peak Region's history is depicted in a 340 square feet (32 m^{2}) mural by Randall Davey, an artist from Santa Fe, New Mexico.

The Will Rogers Shrine of the Sun site is entered through a stone gateway. The grounds are encircled by a stone wall made from the same single block of pink granite quarried from Cheyenne Mountain used to make the tower. Within the stone walls, there are Jo Davidson's statue of Will Rogers, Chinese sculptures, and landscaping with plants native to the region. Avard Fairbanks made a bronze bust of Spencer Penrose.

The building is constructed of granite, steel, cement, iron and brass. Its roof was built of ceramic tile. There were no wood or nails in its construction. The interior has terrazzo floors, marble, and ironwork. Stairs lead to the upper floors.

It was completed in 1937 and dedicated on September 6, 1937. The total construction cost was about $250,000 (equivalent to $5,598,958 in 2025).

=== Monument ===
The sections of the monument are a one-story building with the chapel, the five-story tower, and a staircase connecting the two. Randall Davey painted murals on the first floor of the monument and the first two levels of the stairway depicting the area's historical people and events. The murals, restored in 1994 by Eric Bransby, illustrate scenes of Native Americans; Zebulon Pike's travels; Cripple Creek Mining; William Jackson Palmer, founder of Colorado Springs; and Spencer Penrose. The next three floors contain a photographic history of Will Rogers from his early childhood days in Oklahoma through his time on stage, screen and radio. The last mural is of Will and Wiley Post taken just prior to the fatal crash.

A set of Westminster chimes are played on a vibraharp every quarter-hour or every hour. The sounds of the chimes can be heard 20 miles (32 km) away, (Note: In 1949, Life reported that the chimes sounded on the quarter hour between sunrise and 11 pm.) due to what was a state-of-the-art amplification system when it was built. Songs like Home on the Range and classical music has been broadcast from the tower over the years. At night, the shrine is illuminated by floodlights and the walkway is lighted. Visible below, Cheyenne Lake at The Broadmoor reflects the nearby lights.

=== Chapel ===
The chapel is below the first level. It contains European works of art from the 15th and 16th centuries, including a 16th-century Baroque painting of the Madonna. Furniture from the 16th century includes choir stalls, a Classical Baroque altar, and carved Monk benches. The chapel's crucifix is a German woodcarving. The remains of Spencer and Julie Penrose are interred in the chapel along with two friends, Spencer's social secretary, Horace Devereaux, and Harry Leonard. Eastern works of art include a standing bronze statue of Bodhisattva Guanyin wearing rosary beads and three Buddha statues.

== See also ==
- National Register of Historic Places listings in El Paso County, Colorado
