= Cheyenne Mountain Zoo =

Zoo in Colorado Springs, Colorado, US

- Cheyenne Mountain Zoo Logo

- Robust giraffe conservation program at the zoo
- Interactive map of Cheyenne Mountain Zoo
- 38.77°N 104.855°W
- Date opened: 1926
- Location: Colorado Springs, Colorado, United States
- Land area: 140 acres (57 ha) (40 acres (16 ha) in use)
- No. of animals: 750
- No. of species: 170
- Annual visitors: 600,000+
- Memberships: AZA
- Website: www.cmzoo.org

The Cheyenne Mountain Zoo is a zoological park located southwest of downtown Colorado Springs, Colorado, on Cheyenne Mountain in the United States. At an elevation of 6,714 feet (2,046 m) above sea level, it is the highest zoo in the country. The zoo covers 140 acres (57 ha), 40 of which are in use. The zoo houses more than 750 animals, representing nearly 170 different species, with more than 30 endangered species. The zoo was ranked the #2 best zoo in North America in 2025 by USA Today. It is accredited by the Association of Zoos and Aquariums.

== History ==
Businessman Spencer Penrose was given a gift of a bear in 1916 which inspired him to collect animals. Animals were housed at Penrose's Broadmoor Hotel until a monkey bit a hotel guest. Cheyenne Mountain Zoo was founded in 1926, to house the collection of exotic animals. In 1938, Spencer Penrose incorporated the Zoo as a non-profit public trust. Cheyenne Mountain Zoo is a non-profit 501(c)(3) organization and does not receive local or regional public tax support.

On August 6, 2018, the zoo was hit by fast-moving and unexpected severe weather that brought with it baseball-sized hail. The staff was praised in national media and by the Association of Zoos and Aquariums for their use of the incident command system to swiftly move animals and visitors indoors. But just as some humans were confused and didn't know where to go, many animals stayed outside in confusion despite having on-exhibit dens as required by the AZA. Three zoo employees were hospitalized following efforts to save animals and guests from the unusually large hail. Several animals were hospitalized as well and five animals (two peafowl, a cape vulture, a Muscovy duck, and a young meerkat pup) died of their injuries.

=== Giraffe herd history ===
Cheyenne Mountain is known for its large and prolific giraffe herd. 203 giraffe calves have been born at the zoo since 1954. The zoo is a trusted source for knowledge on caring for giraffes and it maintains a collection of plasma should other facilities need it. When Dobby the giraffe was born at the Denver Zoo in 2017, without the necessary antibodies for survival, Cheyenne Mountain sent banked giraffe plasma from their herd to Denver. The subsequent blood transfusion was successful and Dobby survived.

In 2022, Cheyenne Mountain Zoo established the International Center for the Care and Conservation of Giraffe. Among other things, it is involved in hosting workshops and offering consulting services to improve and enrich the lives of giraffes in human care.

== Exhibits ==
- African Rift Valley is an African savanna themed exhibit containing African lions, African spurred tortoises, Colobus monkeys, Cape vultures, meerkats, red river hogs, reticulated giraffes, and rock hyrax. African Rift Valley cost $11 million to build.
- Encounter Africa opened at a cost of $13.5 million. The Encounter Africa exhibit is home to African cape porcupines, African elephants, eastern black rhinoceros, and meerkats. The exhibit received special recognition at the 2014 AZA Honors and Awards event.
- Australia Walkabout: This exhibit contains a walk-through red-necked wallaby yard, a budgie aviary, emus, American alligators, shelducks, White's tree frogs, Matschie's tree kangaroo, and other species.
- Scutes Family Gallery was originally built in the early 1940s and was formerly known as the Bird and Reptile House. It contains over 40 species of reptiles including Burmese pythons, sloths, lizards, snakes, tortoises and turtles. The name refers to the scutes, or scales that are on most reptiles. Funding for the renovation came from the $13.5 million campaign for the Encounter Africa exhibit.
- Tapir and Okapi Exhibits: Mountain Tapirs and okapis. The area around these exhibits is a favorite spot for the Indian peafowl that freely roam the zoo grounds.
- The Loft: An educational exhibit building that houses goats, American beavers, black-footed ferrets, chinchillas, eclectus parrots, lizards, sloths, ravens, skunks, snakes, three-banded armadillos, tortoises, and Wyoming toads.

Up-close view of the grizzly bears at Rocky Mountain Wild

- My Big Backyard: chickens, American kestrels, honey bees, rabbits, tarantulas, koi, amphibians, tortoises, and invertebrates are exhibited here.
- Asian Highlands exhibits Amur tigers, Amur leopards, snow leopards, and red pandas in naturalistic habitats on the zoo's mountainside.
- Rocky Mountain Wild: Costing the zoo $8.2 million, Rocky Mountain Wild houses bald eagles, Canadian lynx, Greenback cutthroat trout, Grizzly bears, Mexican wolves, moose, cougars, porcupines, river otters, rainbow trout and wood ducks.
- Primate World: Primate World contains apes and other animals. Sumatran and Bornean orangutans, Western lowland gorillas, golden lion tamarins, siamangs, and naked mole rats are exhibited.
- Rocky Cliffs: This exhibit highlights Rocky Mountain goats, which are native to the area.
- Water's Edge: Africa: This exhibit, opened in 2020, houses Nile hippopotamuses, African penguins, and other species including ring-tailed lemurs, warthogs, and Kenya crested guineafowl.

== Conservation ==
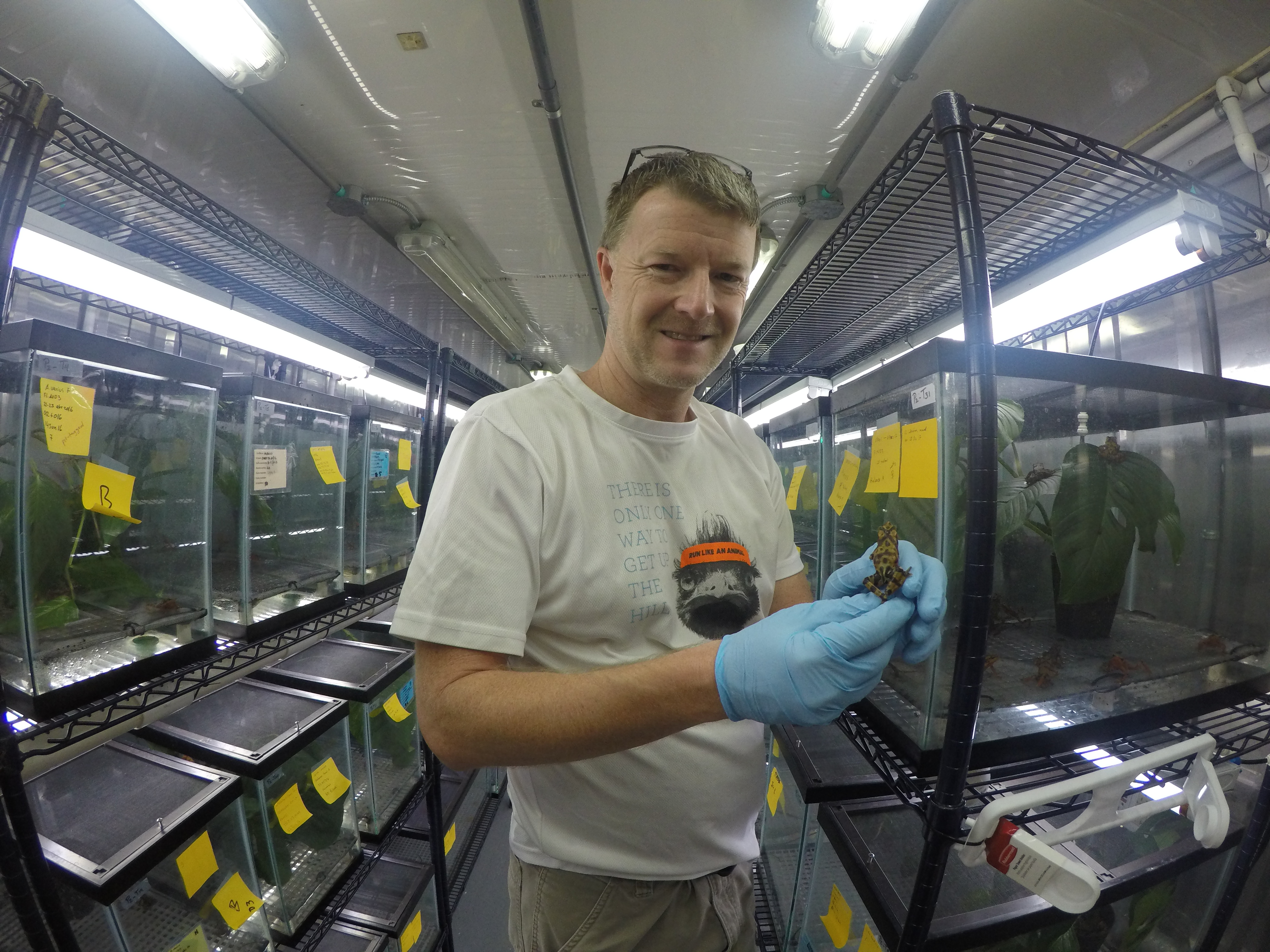
CMZ veterinarian and amphibian specialist Eric Klaphake working collaboratively with other organizations for conservation and research

The zoo breeds endangered animals such as black-footed ferrets, Wyoming toads and Mexican gray wolves. The zoo participates in over 30 Species Survival Plan programs.

In particular, Cheyenne Mountain Zoo has had unique success breeding black-footed ferrets and 647 kits have been born "on the mountain" as of 2024.

The zoo financially supports multiple field conservation programs through Quarters for Conservation which allows guests to choose what programs they want to support. It began in 2008, and the zoo raised over $2 million in the following decade. It also participates in the Panama Amphibian Rescue and Conservation project along with the Houston Zoo, the Smithsonian Tropical Research Institute, the Smithsonian Conservation Biology Institute, and Zoo New England to release endangered amphibian species back to the wild.

== Other attractions ==
- Carousel: The c. 1925 Allan Herschell Company carousel, active at the Zoo since 1937.
- Mountaineer Sky Ride: An open-air, ski lift style ride above the Rocky Mountain goat, grizzly bear and Amur tiger exhibits. .
- Will Rogers Shrine of the Sun: Admission to the zoo includes access to the Cheyenne Mountain Highway and Will Rogers Shrine of the Sun.

== Gallery ==
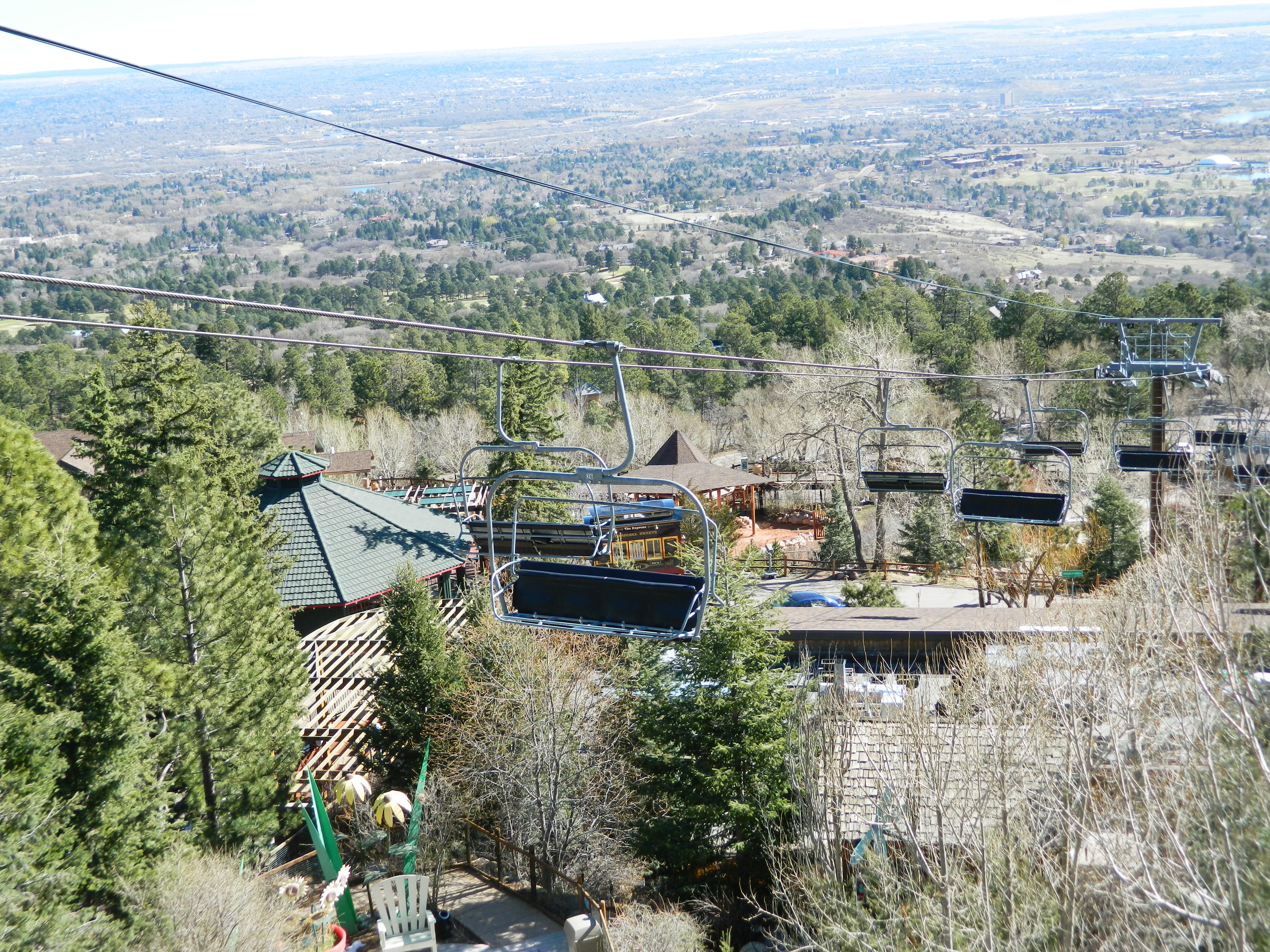
Mountaineer Sky Ride, a cable lift through the zoo

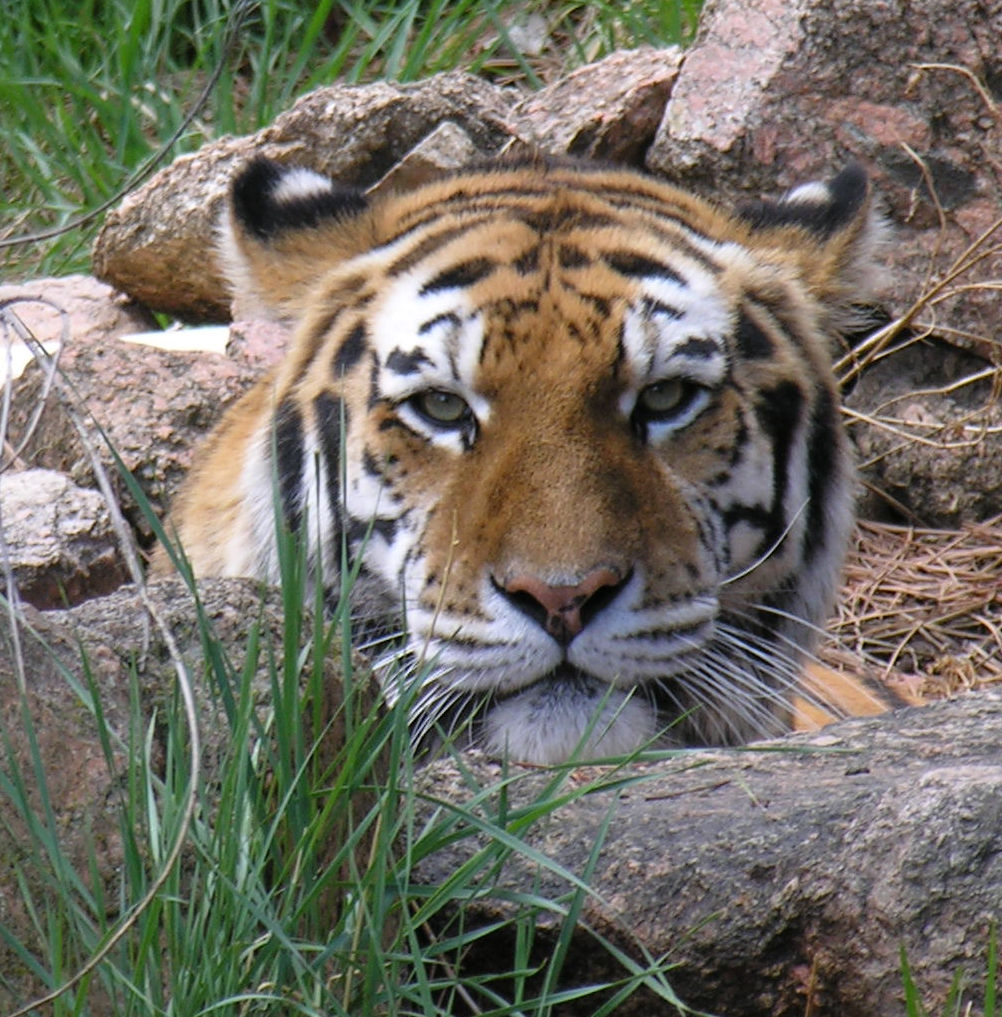
Tiger

Bald eagle at the zoo

Elephant exhibit

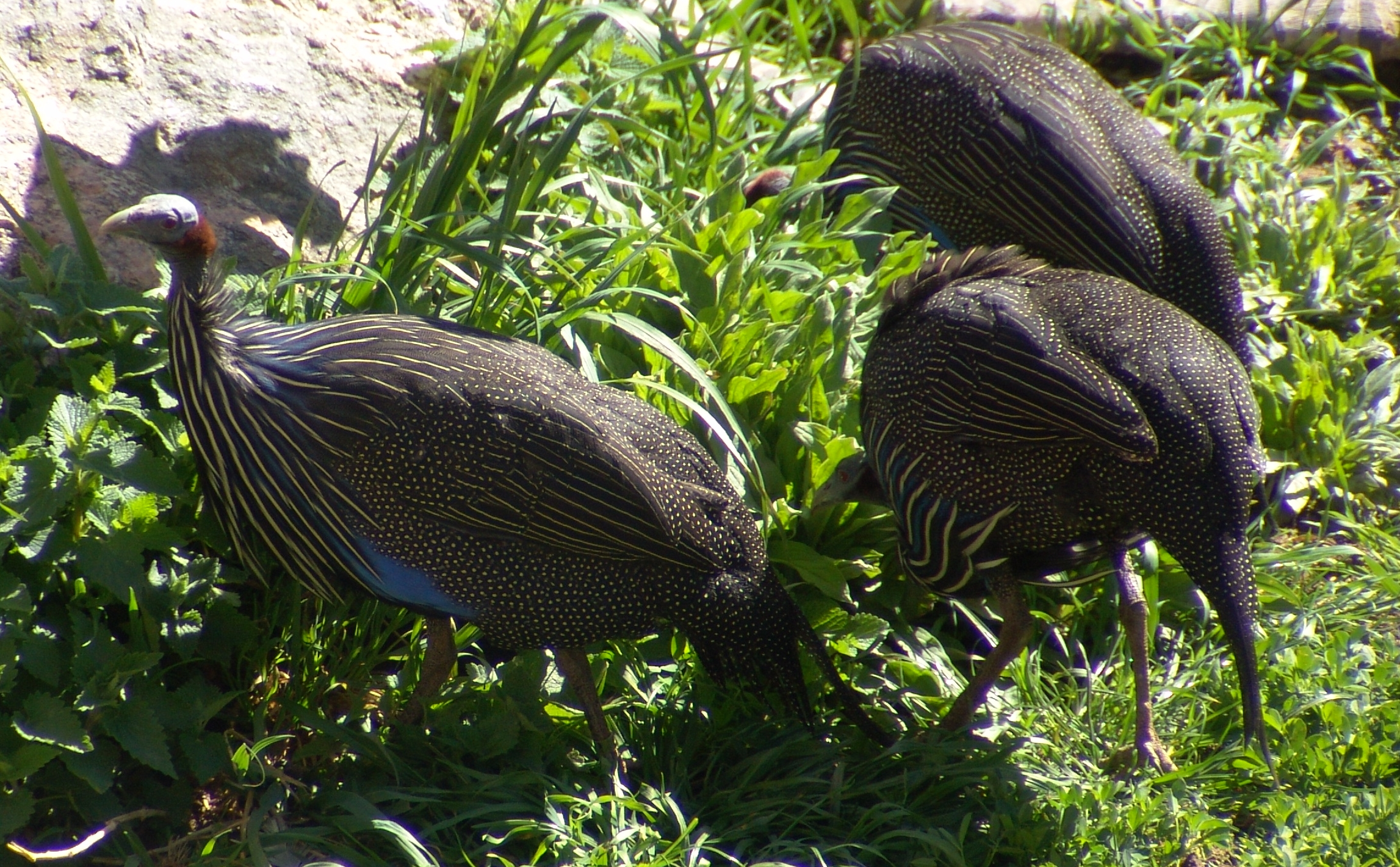
Vulturine guineafowl (Acryllium vulturinum)

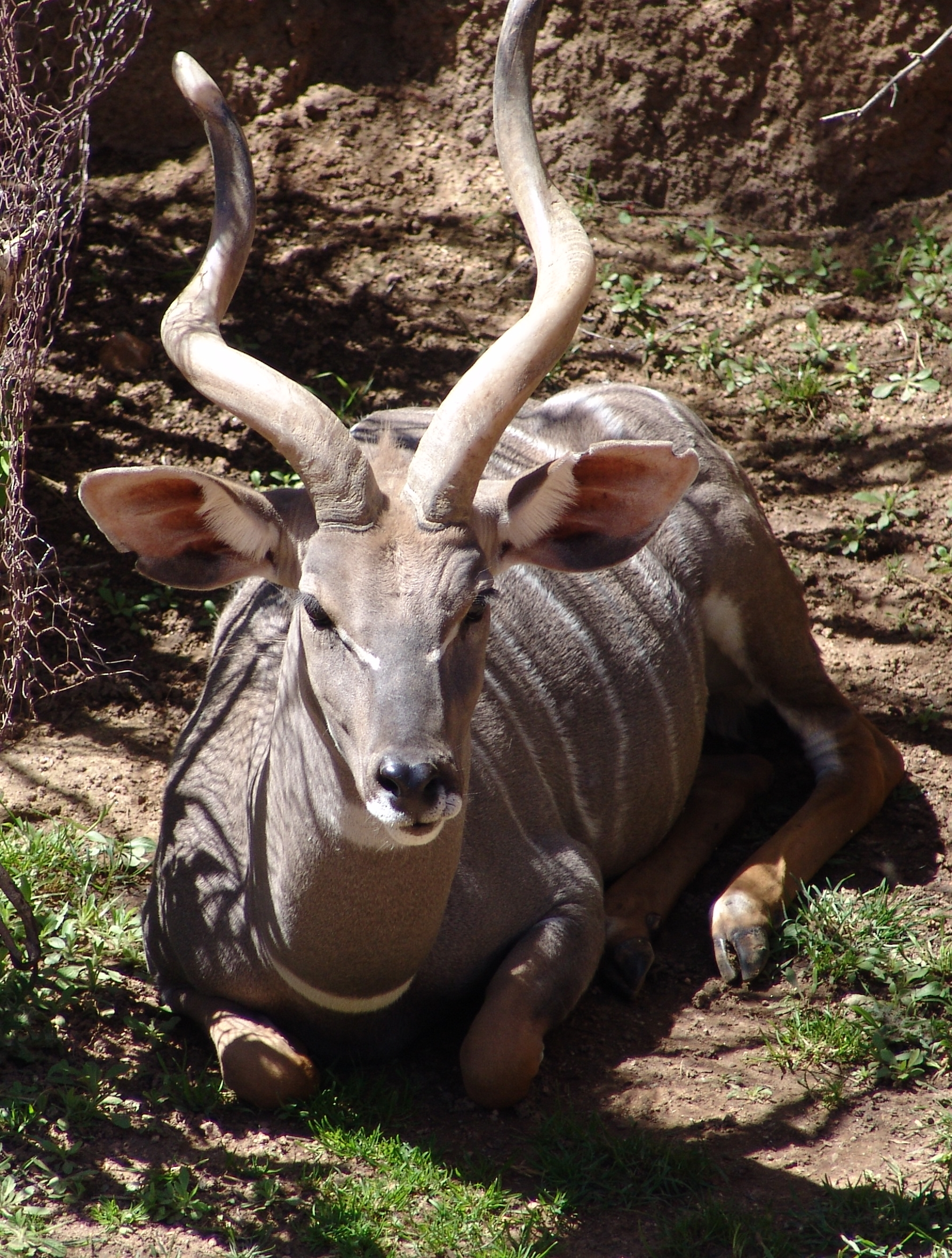
Lesser kudu (Tragelaphus imberbis)

American grizzly bear at the zoo

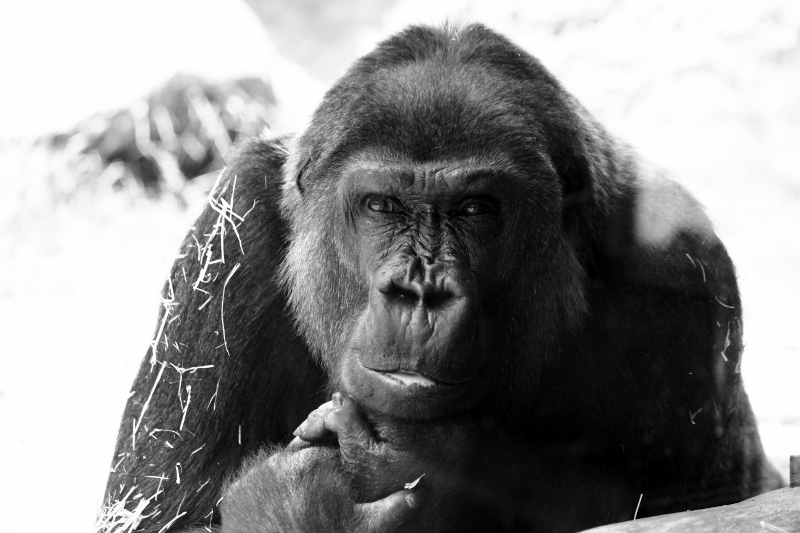
Gorilla

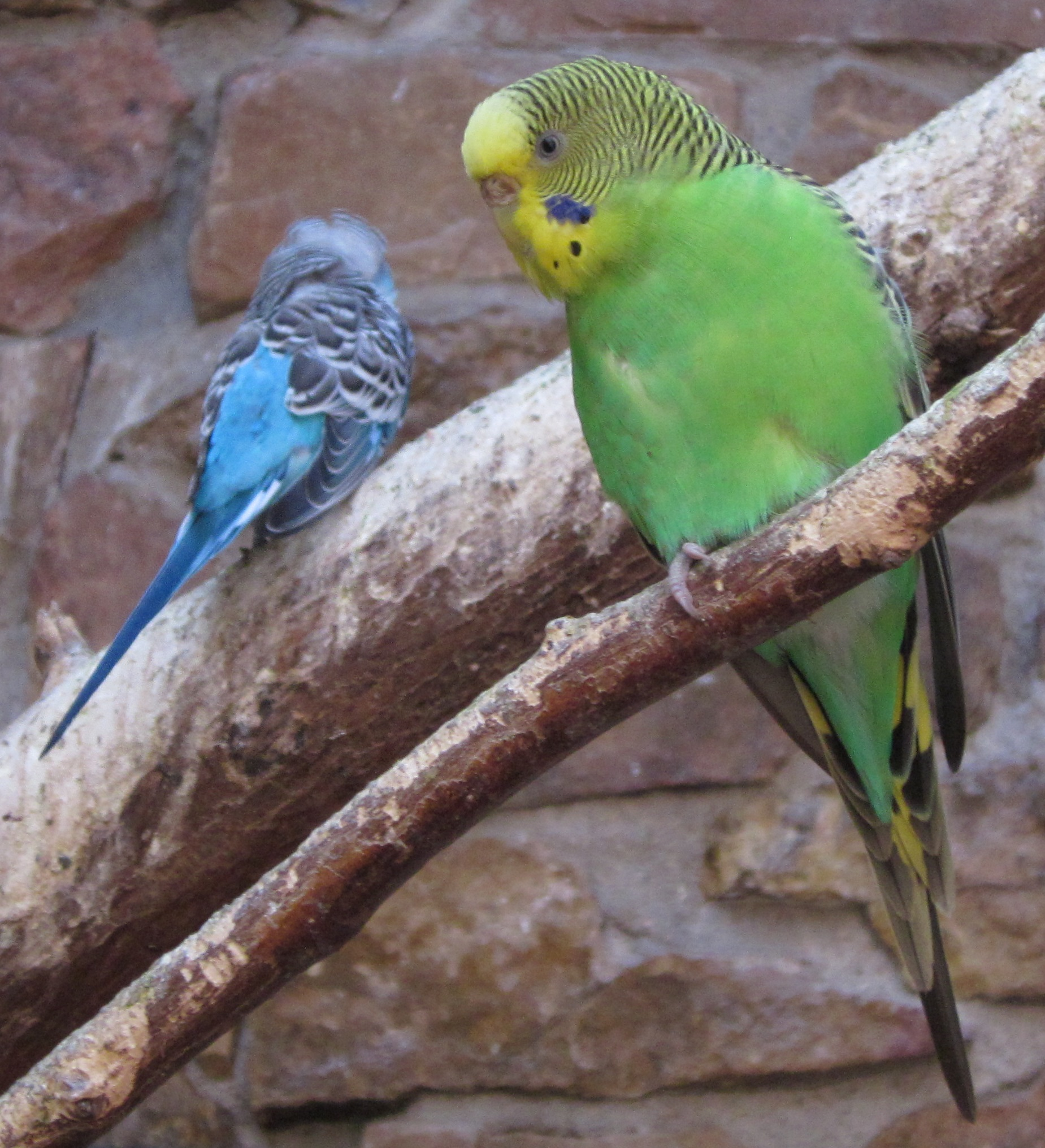
Bird exhibit

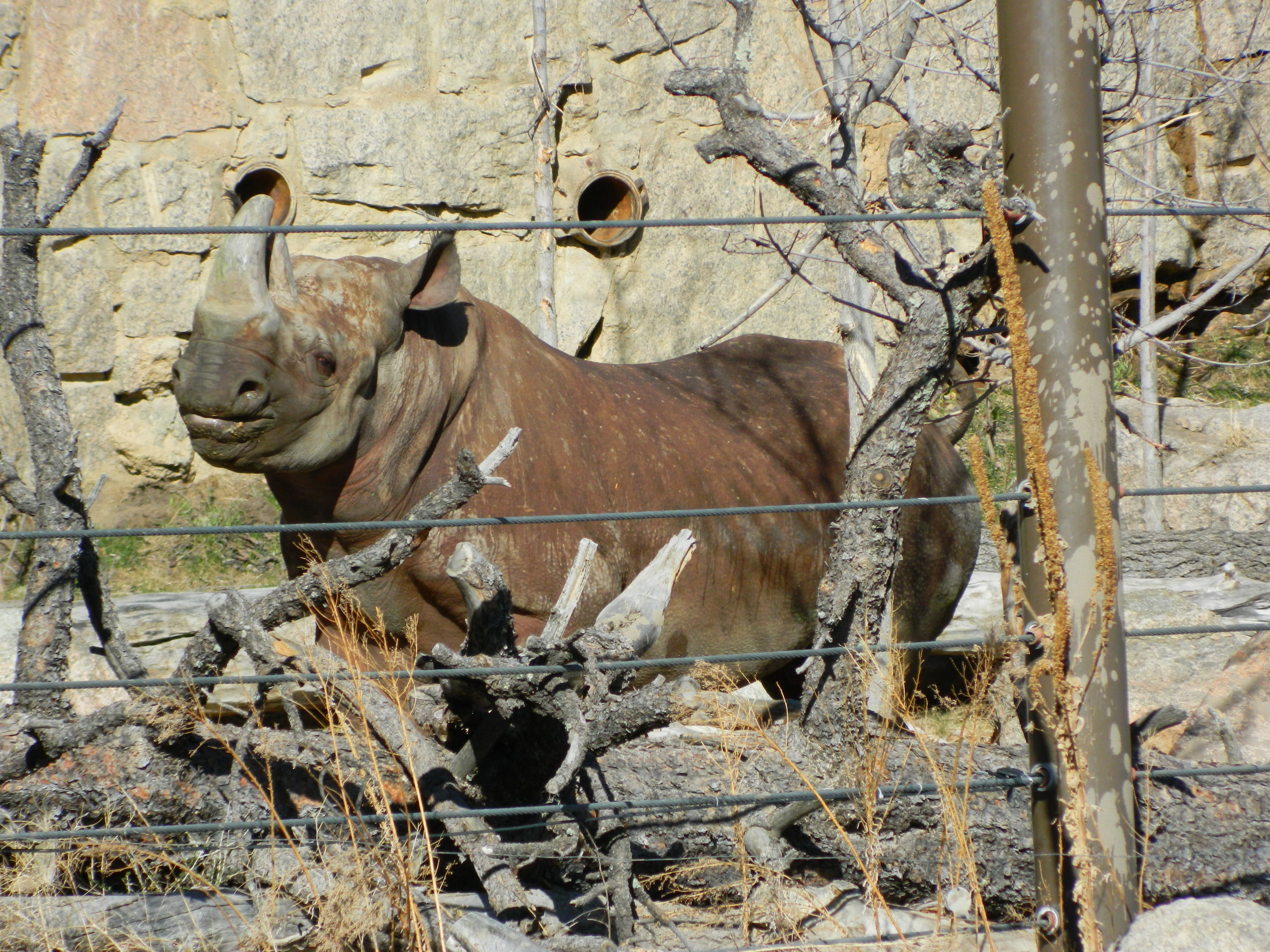
Black rhinoceros
