= Albert E. Carlton =

American investor

Albert E. Carlton or Bert Carlton (20 February 1866 – 1931) was an investor in Colorado banks, mines and railroads. Based upon the success of his mines in Cripple Creek, he was known as "King of Cripple Creek".

== Early life and career ==
Albert E. Carlton was born on February 20, 1866, in Warren, Illinois, to H. M. Carlton, a merchant from Massachusetts. He attended Beloit College in Wisconsin. He accepted a clerk position in the mercantile trade after graduation. Carlton became ill with tuberculosis and came to Colorado in 1889 to improve his health. His health improved dramatically by 1891.

Carlton was a dry goods store clerk in Colorado Springs. (Note: The book Successful American states that in 1891 Calton worked in the coal business in Cripple Creek.) Latching on to the 1891 gold boom in Cripple Creek, Carlton started a freight hauling business from Colorado Midland at Divide with his brother, Leslie. The Colorado Trading and Transfer Company served the mining communities, and "eventually gained control of much of the freight business" serving the mining towns. Based upon the income from his freight business, Carlton invested in mines, banks and railroads.

He invested in the Colorado Midland Railroad to carry freight and in businesses in Cripple Creek.

== King of Cripple Creek ==
He was named "King of Cripple Creek" due to the success of his mines there, including Cresson Mine,"one of the most profitable mines in the town." He owned "nearly every mine in Cripple Creek" and became a millionaire by 1930.

== Carlton House ==
Carlton and his wife, Ethel Frizzell-Carlton, built the Carlton House in Pine Valley, Colorado Springs. Carlton purchased the property in 1928 from William A. Otis to build a home for his wife. Mrs. Carlton had become enamored of the Spanish Colonial Revival architecture during her travels across Southern California. Subsequently, architect Richard Requa was hired to design their home. The house was a "leading social center in the region." He preferred to live at The Broadmoor resort and never lived at the Pine Valley home.

== Death ==
Mr. Carlton died in 1931.

== See also ==
- Tuberculosis treatment in Colorado Springs
