= Pikes Peak Highway =

Alpine road in Colorado, United States

Coordinates: 38°54′30″N 104°58′55″W

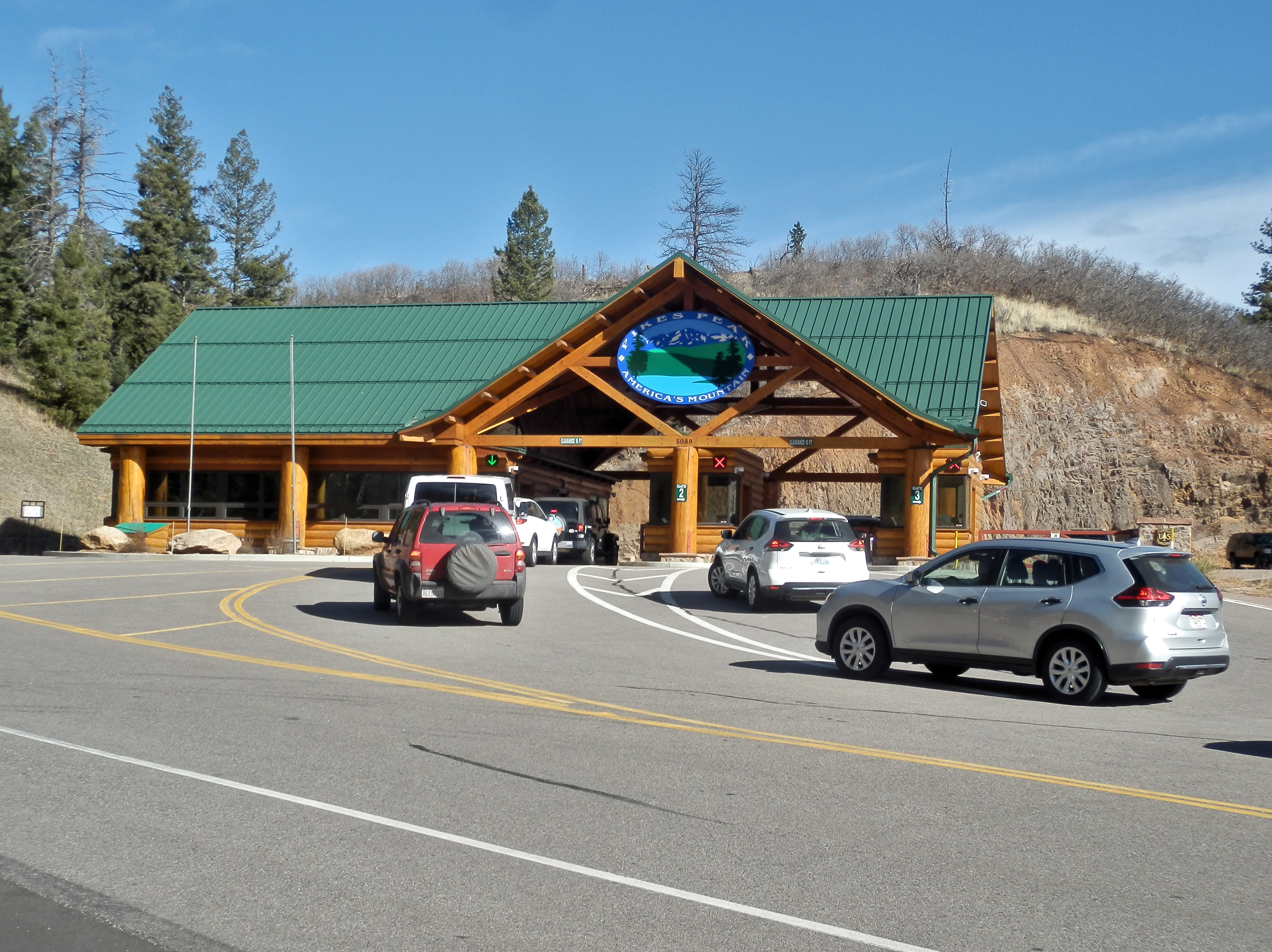
Entrance to the Pikes Peak Highway

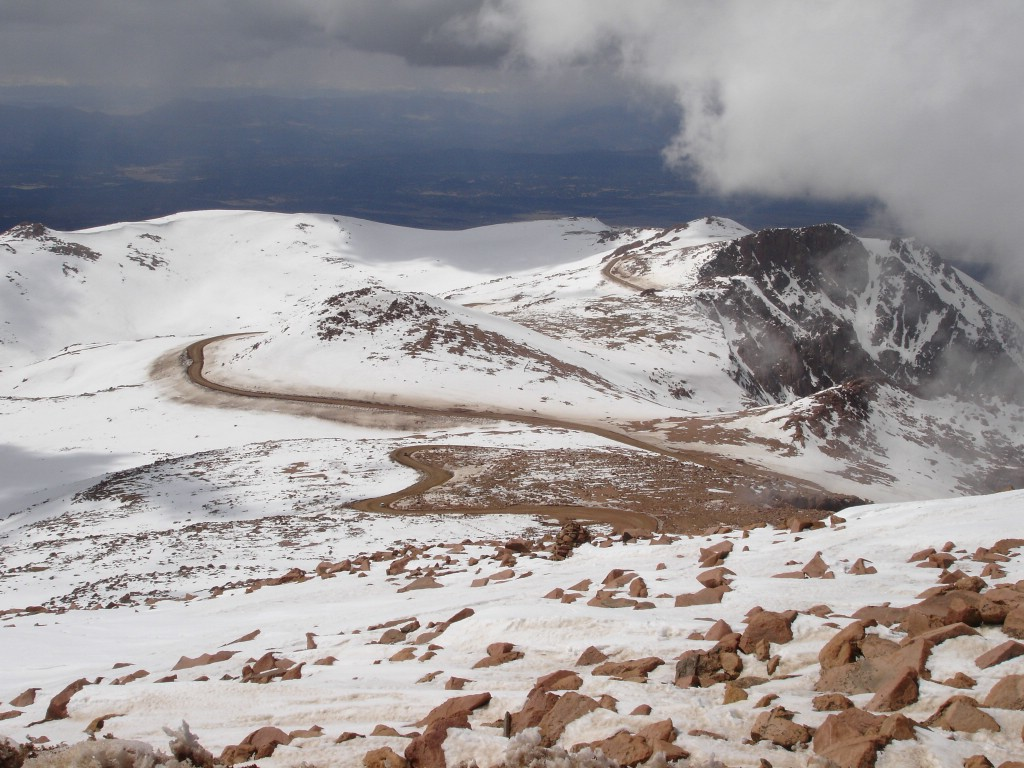
A view of the highway as it nears the summit

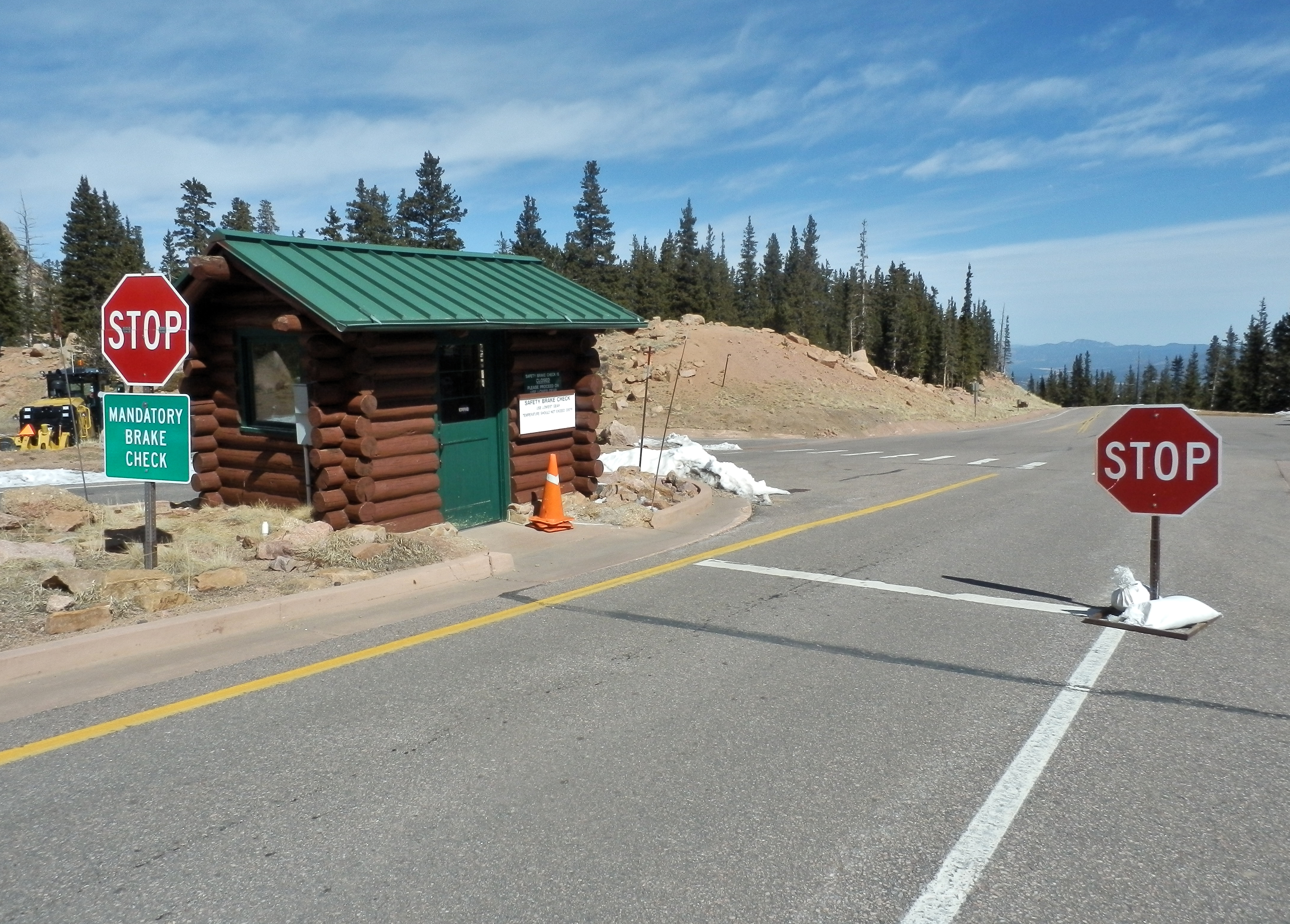
Downhill drivers have to check the brake temperatures of their vehicle at this station

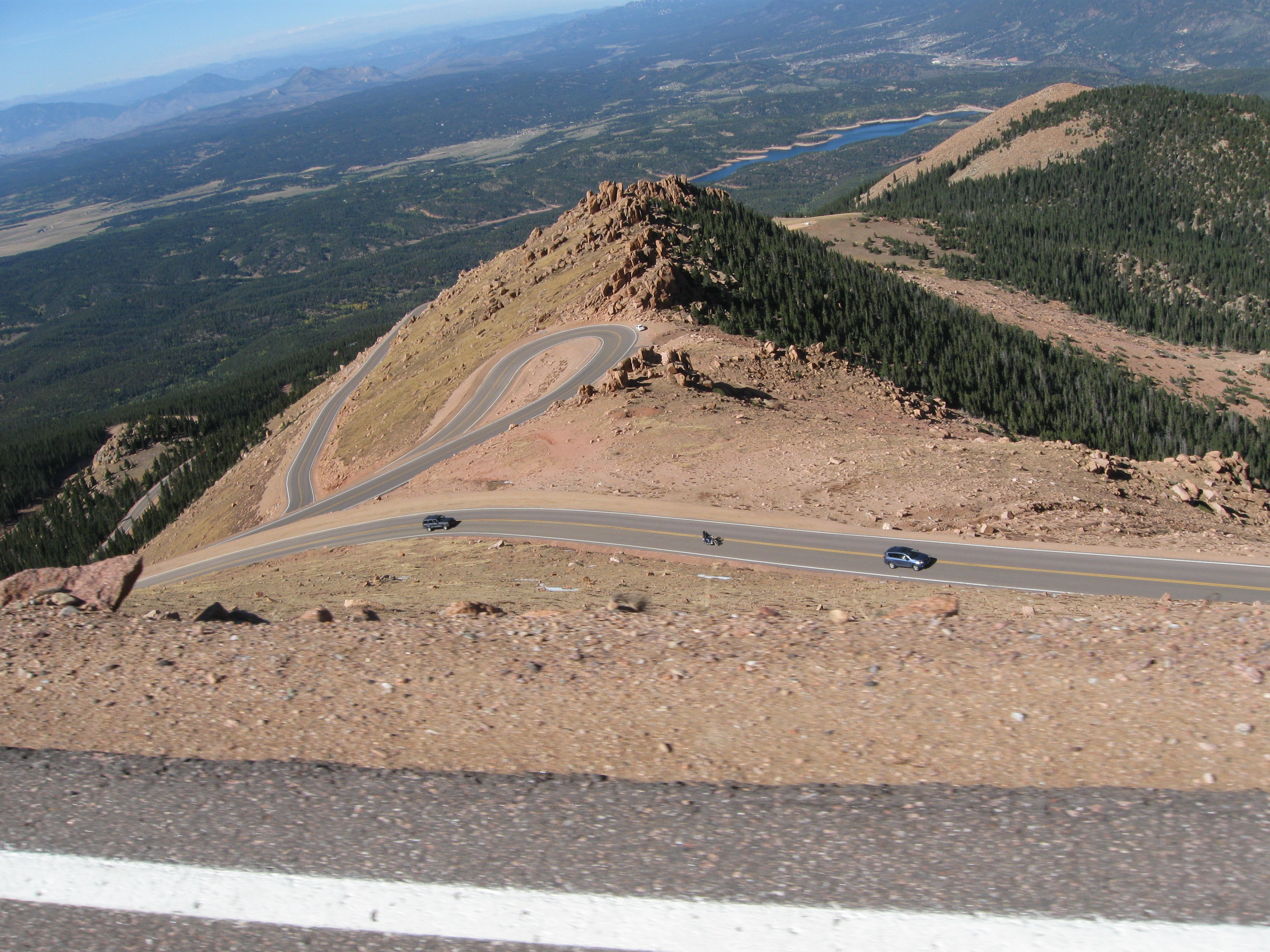
The winding Pikes Peak Highway, looking down from 13,000 feet (3,960 m) at milepost 16 September 2011

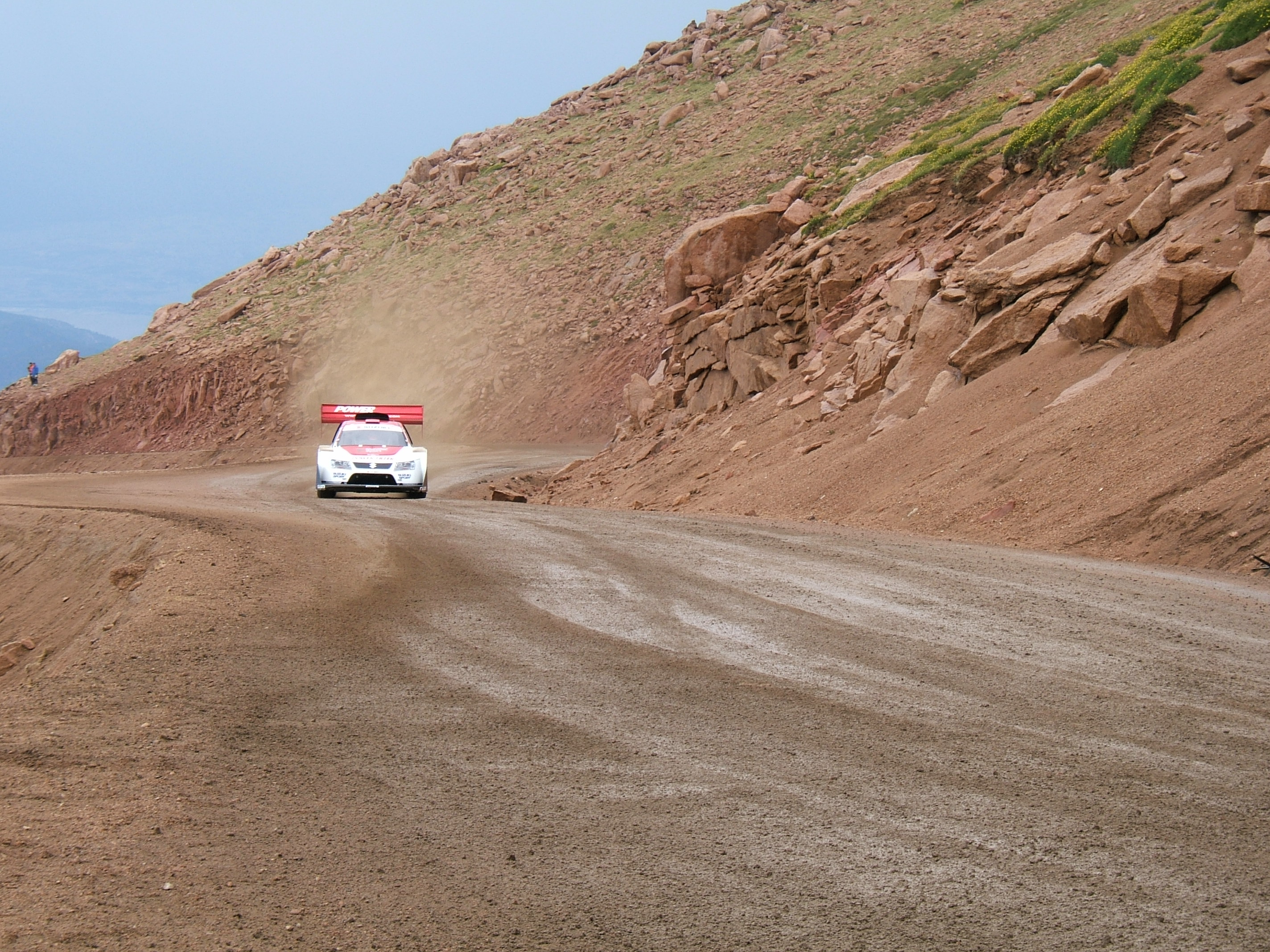
Suzuki Grand Vitara at the 2006 Race to the Clouds

The Pikes Peak Highway is a 19-mile (31 km) toll road that runs from Cascade, Colorado to the summit of Pikes Peak in El Paso County, at an altitude of 14,115 feet (4,302 m). It is at least partially open year-round, up to the altitude where snow removal becomes excessively difficult.

The toll structure varies depending on time of year, with prices charged per person, $18 per adult and $8 per child, as of May 2025.

== Highway ==
The Pikes Peak Highway was constructed in 1915 and financed by Spencer Penrose at a cost of US$500,000 (equivalent to $15,541,118 in 2024).

An earlier road up the mountain, the Pike's Peak Carriage Road, dates back to 1888. Thousands of tourists traveled along the Pikes Peak Carriage Road up to Pikes Peak's summit. It was opened by the Cascade Town Company in 1888 and closed in 1902.

== Maintenance ==
It was maintained by the Colorado Department of Transportation as Colorado State Highway 250 from 1939 until 1947. Since 1947 the road has been maintained by the city of Colorado Springs.

== Races ==
The highway has been home to an annual automobile and motorcycle race called the Pikes Peak International Hillclimb since 1916.

Another race is the Pikes Peak Cycling Hill Climb (formerly Assault on the Peak), first held in 2010. The 2016 edition was also the first edition of the USA Cycling Hill Climb National Championship.

== Environmental damage claim ==
Litigation was pursued by the Sierra Club in 1998, on grounds of environmental damage from the gravel portion of the road. The environmental damage was caused primarily by the 150,000,000 pounds (70,000 metric tons) of gravel that washed away annually, the same amount that needed to be hauled up the mountain each year in order to maintain the road surface. Environmental damage included alpine ponds and wetlands becoming filled with gravel, and layers of gravel averaging 2 to 4 feet (0.6 to 1.2 m) deep covering the forest floor below. Pursuant to the settlement agreed by the Sierra Club and the City of Colorado Springs, the unpaved portion of the Pikes Peak Highway became a hard-surface road, despite concerns that such a project would radically change the nature of the annual automobile and motorcycle race. The paving project was completed on October 1, 2011.

Pike's Peak Hill Climb champion Rod Millen warned that paving the road would put an end to the race. However, the race went ahead normally in 2012 and has continued ever since.

== Climate ==
There is a SNOTEL weather station near the Glen Cove Visitor Center, located at the 13-mile marker for Pikes Peak Highway. At 11450 feet (3493 m), Glen Cove is in the subalpine life zone and has a subalpine climate (Köppen Dfc).

Climate data for Glen Cove, Colorado, 2005–2020 normals: 11460ft (3493m)
Month	Jan	Feb	Mar	Apr	May	Jun	Jul	Aug	Sep	Oct	Nov	Dec	Year
Record high °F (°C)	54 (12)	65 (18)	73 (23)	76 (24)	85 (29)	88 (31)	90 (32)	82 (28)	74 (23)	74 (23)	58 (14)	68 (20)	90 (32)
Mean maximum °F (°C)	47.6 (8.7)	47.1 (8.4)	54.2 (12.3)	57.4 (14.1)	63.4 (17.4)	72.1 (22.3)	72.9 (22.7)	67.3 (19.6)	65.5 (18.6)	58.5 (14.7)	51.4 (10.8)	45.8 (7.7)	73.6 (23.1)
Mean daily maximum °F (°C)	30.7 (−0.7)	32.1 (0.1)	39.6 (4.2)	43.9 (6.6)	50.9 (10.5)	61.4 (16.3)	64.1 (17.8)	61.5 (16.4)	56.5 (13.6)	45.9 (7.7)	37.5 (3.1)	29.8 (−1.2)	46.2 (7.9)
Daily mean °F (°C)	21.0 (−6.1)	21.8 (−5.7)	28.2 (−2.1)	32.9 (0.5)	40.5 (4.7)	50.6 (10.3)	54.0 (12.2)	51.9 (11.1)	46.8 (8.2)	36.9 (2.7)	28.8 (−1.8)	20.5 (−6.4)	36.2 (2.3)
Mean daily minimum °F (°C)	11.4 (−11.4)	11.4 (−11.4)	17.0 (−8.3)	22.1 (−5.5)	30.1 (−1.1)	39.9 (4.4)	43.8 (6.6)	41.7 (5.4)	37.4 (3.0)	27.5 (−2.5)	20.3 (−6.5)	11.3 (−11.5)	26.2 (−3.2)
Mean minimum °F (°C)	−7.7 (−22.1)	−8.4 (−22.4)	−2.4 (−19.1)	3.7 (−15.7)	13.1 (−10.5)	28.3 (−2.1)	36.0 (2.2)	32.7 (0.4)	25.0 (−3.9)	7.1 (−13.8)	0.0 (−17.8)	−11.2 (−24.0)	−14.7 (−25.9)
Record low °F (°C)	−21 (−29)	−30 (−34)	−11 (−24)	−6 (−21)	2 (−17)	12 (−11)	22 (−6)	17 (−8)	6 (−14)	−10 (−23)	−10 (−23)	−21 (−29)	−30 (−34)
Average precipitation inches (mm)	0.90 (23)	1.45 (37)	2.68 (68)	4.10 (104)	3.38 (86)	2.48 (63)	3.88 (99)	4.24 (108)	2.06 (52)	1.91 (49)	1.52 (39)	1.29 (33)	29.89 (761)
Source 1: XMACIS2
Source 2: NOAA (Precipitation)

== See also ==
- Colorado Springs, Colorado
- Southern Rocky Mountains
- Mountain peaks of Colorado
