= Spencer Penrose =

American businessman (1865–1939)

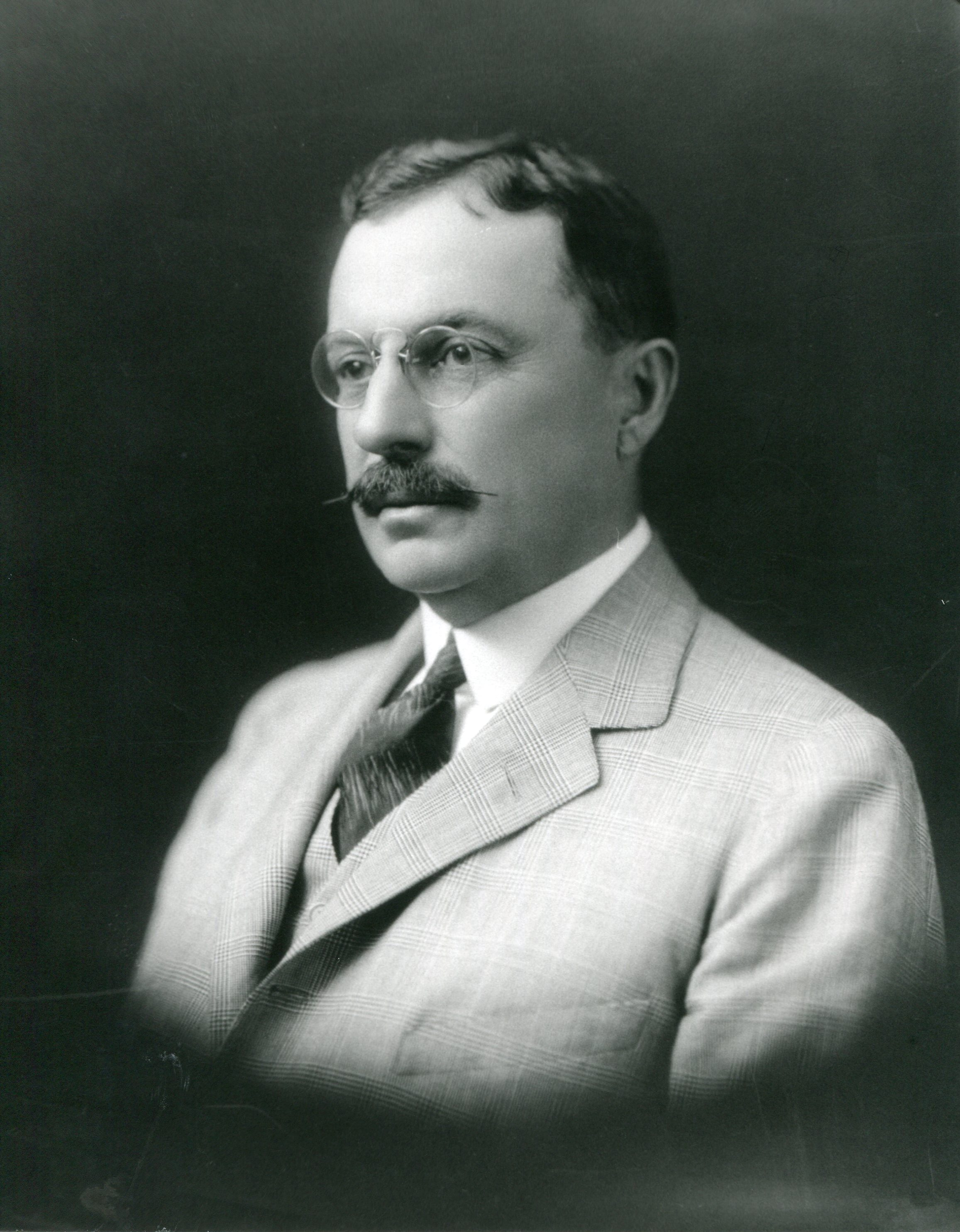
Penrose

Spencer Penrose (November 2, 1865 – December 7, 1939) was an American entrepreneur and philanthropist. He made his fortune from mining, ore processing, and real estate speculation in Colorado and other parts of the West. He founded the Utah Copper Company in 1903, and also established mining operations in Arizona, New Mexico and Nevada.

He settled with his fortune in Colorado Springs, Colorado, where he and partner Charles L. Tutt had a road constructed to the top of Pikes Peak. They initiated an annual motor car race to the top. In 1918 Penrose opened an opulent resort hotel known as The Broadmoor, built outside the city which was a "dry" community. In 1937 he and his wife Julie established the El Pomar Foundation, to support activities to improve Colorado. In 2001, Penrose was inducted into the Hall of Great Westerners of the National Cowboy & Western Heritage Museum.

== Early life and education ==
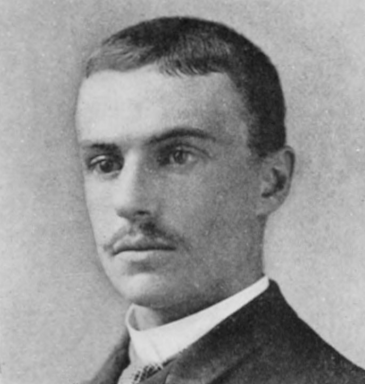
Penrose at Harvard, c. 1886

Spencer "Spec" Penrose was born on November 2, 1865, as the fifth of seven sons of a prominent Philadelphia family. The family traces its paternal line to immigrant ancestor Bartholomew Penrose, who arrived in Philadelphia in 1698. Spencer's father, Richard Alexander Fullerton Penrose, was a doctor, who in 1854 founded the Children's Hospital of Philadelphia. Spencer's mother, Sarah Hannah (Boies) Penrose, promoted a simple life of austerity for her family. The first son died in infancy, leaving Boies Penrose, Charles Bingham, Richard Alexander Fullerton Jr., Spencer, Francis Boies, and Phillip Thomas. The Penrose men attended Harvard University, and Boies, Charles, and Richard graduated from there with high honors. Unlike them, Spencer graduated from Harvard at the bottom of his class, but his ambitions were to travel west and make his career on the frontier, rather than as a doctor, lawyer or politician like his brothers.

== Western travels and enterprises ==
After Harvard, Spencer Penrose migrated to Las Cruces, New Mexico. He established several businesses, selling each for enough to cut his losses and try his next venture. In 1892 his brother, Richard – by then a successful geologist – and Philadelphia friend, Charles L. Tutt wrote to him about a potential gold rush in Cripple Creek, Colorado.

Tutt had gone to Colorado Springs, Colorado in 1884, where he found initial success in real estate in the developing city. Tutt and Penrose had been childhood friends; both their fathers were doctors at the children's hospital. Tutt loaned Penrose the money to purchase a half stake in his Cripple Creek real estate business, which included the Cash on Delivery (C.O.D.) Mine. This was the beginning of a long-lasting partnership between the two men. The C.O.D. Mine was one of the most successful in Cripple Creek but, as Penrose and Tutt continued their partnership and operations, they began to realize the value of opening a new business in ore processing.

Tutt and Penrose sold the C.O.D. mine in 1895 for $250,000 and invested the money in their new venture: the Colorado-Philadelphia Reduction Company, an ore-processing facility in Old Colorado City. The two men knew they would need someone with expertise in ore processing, so they brought on tenured miner and miller, Charles Mather MacNeill. The new partnership among Tutt, Penrose, and MacNeill resulted in increased business at the Colorado-Philadelphia Reduction Company; by 1899 its plant was treating over $3 million worth of Cripple Creek ore annually. The three men would create a mining, milling, and real estate empire in the years that followed.

During his western business activities, Penrose invested in several regional railroad enterprises, including the Colorado Midland Railway, the Midland Terminal Railway, the Short Line Railway, the Beaver, Penrose and Northern Railway, the Manitou and Pikes Peak Railway, the Mount Manitou Incline Railway, and the Denver and Rio Grande Western Railroad

He played a significant role in the development and promotion of the Colorado Midland and the Midland Terminal railroads, which were central to transportation and mining operations in central Colorado during the late nineteenth century.

The town of Penrose, located northeast of Florence, Colorado, was promoted as an agricultural center, with its surrounding land marketed as suitable for fruit cultivation in competition with the fruit-growing industry of Grand Junction on Colorado’s Western Slope. An unusual aspect of this development plan was the construction of the short Beaver, Penrose and Northern Railway, intended to support agricultural and commercial activity in the area.

As their interests in Cripple Creek dwindled, Tutt, Penrose, and MacNeill followed a suggestion of metallurgist Daniel C. Jackling, who believed that a massive copper deposit located in Bingham Canyon, Utah could be successfully mined. Jackling had been a metallurgist for the Bingham Canyon Gold & Silver Mine, and was the chief engineer at the US Reduction Plant Company in Florence, Colorado. A survey revealed the Bingham Canyon ore deposit contained only 2% copper. After consulting both Jackling and geologist Richard Penrose, Spencer's brother, the men determined that the copper could yield high profits if they could efficiently extract the copper from the ore.

Penrose formed the Utah Copper Company in 1903. He worked with others to design a mill to extract the copper at a rate generally considered impossible by other mining and milling experts. Their gamble paid off, and the men developed a fast-growing enterprise that mined and milled more copper than they had imagined was possible. Penrose's success in Utah encouraged him to invest and begin copper mining operations across the Southwest in Arizona, New Mexico, and Nevada. The works in Cripple Creek and Utah Copper generated an immense fortune for Penrose, which he brought with him to Colorado Springs, Colorado.

== Colorado Springs and The Broadmoor ==
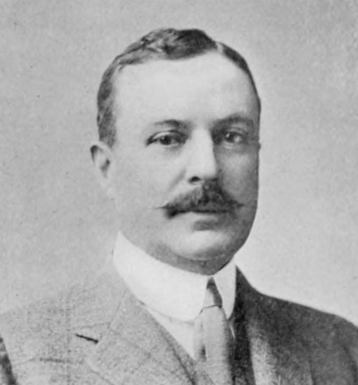
c. 1911

Penrose returned to Colorado Springs as a successful entrepreneur. During this time, he met his future wife, widow Julie Villiers (Lewis) McMillan. Spencer and Julie met and became friends through overlapping social circles in the city. Although Penrose had formerly pledged to stay a bachelor, he changed his mind. The two married in London, England, on April 28, 1906, and traveled in Europe for their honeymoon. Inspired by his stays in grand European hotels and resorts, Penrose returned to Colorado Springs intending to build his own hotel.

A few years later, the Penroses bought the residence of their close friend, Grace Goodyear Potter, who had the Spanish-style villa constructed in 1910. The house was built on the site of the Dixon Apple Orchard, for which the estate was named El Pomar (colloquial Spanish for "the orchard"). The Penroses renovated the house, adding two stories, corona marble tiles, carved wood panels, and crystal chandeliers. They hired the Olmsted Brothers to design the surrounding grounds.

Later the house changed ownership. Known as the Penrose House, it is listed on the National Register of Historic Places. Now it is owned and operated as a conference and meeting space. It is available at no charge to Colorado's nonprofit organizations.

Together with his longtime partner Charles Tutt, Penrose completed a plan to build a road to the 14,115-foot summit of Pikes Peak, to promote tourism in the area. At a cost of $283,000, the highway was completed on August 1, 1916. The same year, Penrose organized the first motor race to the summit; established annually, it is the second-oldest motor car race in the US. It still runs in the early 21st century, and is known as the Broadmoor Pikes Peak International Hill Climb.

Penrose began work on his project, The Broadmoor Hotel. He reportedly wanted to buy the Antlers Hotel from Colorado Springs founder William Jackson Palmer, who had it rebuilt in 1901 after a fire, but Palmer wouldn't sell. Palmer had established Colorado Springs as a "dry city", and Penrose had different ideas for what would be offered at his hotel.

In 1916 Penrose purchased a site outside the boundaries of the city for $90,000, from Prussian Count James Pourtales. Penrose commissioned architects to design the hotel of his dreams. After reviewing several designs, Penrose selected the design of the firm Warren and Wetmore, known for their work in New York City, including Grand Central Terminal. The contractors broke ground in April 1917 and a grand opening was held at the hotel on June 29, 1918. Its cost exceeded $3 million. The Broadmoor attracted numerous visitors. Targeting Midwesterners, Penrose placed advertisements in notable publications and invited celebrities to pose for photos and provide testimonials to the opulence of the Broadmoor. The accompanying golf course also attracted wealthy visitors from across the country.

== Philanthropy and legacy ==
Spencer and Julie Penrose were philanthropists, giving strong financial support to major civic projects in Colorado Springs. Their legacy projects include the Cheyenne Mountain Zoo, Will Rogers Shrine of the Sun, Colorado Springs Fine Arts Center, Pikes Peak Highway, and the Glockner-Penrose Hospital (now Penrose-St. Francis Health Services).

They founded El Pomar Foundation on December 17, 1937. With a mission "to enhance, encourage, and promote the future and current well-being of the people of Colorado," El Pomar Foundation continues as a grantmaking organization. From an initial combined gift of $21 million, the assets of the Foundation now exceed $600 million. Its grants have yielded more than $1.2 billion in results for the state of Colorado. El Pomar also operates community stewardship programs, including: Awards for Excellence, Regional Partnerships, and a two-year Fellowship for young leaders.

The Foundation also operates two properties of the Penrose family: The Will Rogers Shrine of the Sun, where the Penroses are entombed; and the Penrose Heritage Museum, which showcases the Penroses' collection of carriages, as well as artifacts from their travels. Penrose died in 1939, two years after founding El Pomar Foundation. He was survived by Julie, who served as President of the Foundation until her death in 1956.

- Pikes Peak Hill Climb Museum Hall of Fame (1997)
- Hall of Great Westerners of the National Cowboy & Western Heritage Museum (2001)

== Sources ==
- "El Pomar". (n.d.), foundation website
- Noel, T. J., & Norman, C. M. (2002). Pikes Peak Partnership: The Penroses and the Tutts. University Press of Colorado.
