= El Pomar Foundation =

Private, general purpose foundation

El Pomar Foundation is a private, general purpose foundation established in 1937 by Spencer and Julie Penrose. With a mission to "enhance, encourage, and promote the current and future well-being of the people of Colorado," El Pomar Foundation provides more than $22 million annually in grants and programs throughout the state.

== History ==
Spencer Penrose incorporated El Pomar Foundation in 1937 with a donation of 15,000 shares of stock in El Pomar Investment Company and a check for $129,500. In its first year, the Foundation made 5 grants, totaling $81,737, to: Junior League of Colorado Springs Nutrition Camp, Fountain Valley School of Colorado, Penrose Colorado Community School, Glockner Hospital, and the Boys & Girls Club of Colorado Springs. Penrose contributed an additional $15 million two years later upon his death in 1939 and Julie Penrose served as the President of the Foundation until her death in 1956.

The name "El Pomar," comes from the name of the estate that Spencer and Julie purchased for their home in Colorado Springs. The house was built on the site of the Dixon Apple Orchard and El Pomar translates to "the orchard" in Catalan.

The Foundation celebrated its 80th anniversary in 2017. The Foundation’s assets have grown to more than $600 million as of 2018.

== Grant Making & Funds ==
El Pomar Foundation serves as a general purpose foundation, providing Trustee-approved grants across five grant making areas: arts and culture, civic and community initiatives, education, health, and human services. The Foundation also operates several endowed funds.

Anna Keesling Ackerman Fund:

Supports nonprofit organizations serving the Pikes Peak Region, with a specific focus on organizations working in arts and humanities, education, health, human services, and civic and community initiatives.

Freda Hambrick Fund:

Supports nonprofit organizations that prevent cruelty to animals, provide direct care and medical assistance, and offer educational programs for the proper care of and attention to animals within the state of Colorado.

Sally Beck Fund:

Supports nonprofit organizations providing direct care to equines, therapeutic riding programs, equine education programs, and equine-related disaster response programs.

Wildland Fire Fund:

Assists with the immediate emergency needs of volunteer fire fighting agencies and first responders throughout the state of Colorado.

Dorothy Ferrand Fund:

Provides support to organizations making a significant impact on the educational, medical, health care and other needs of low-income children and their parents in the Pikes Peak region (by invitation only).

Karl E. Eitel Fund:

Supports the work of Colorado nonprofit organizations serving at-risk youth (by invitation only).

Olin Fund:

Supports investments in Olin Field at the Colorado Springs Youth Sports Park, the business and economics majors at the University of Colorado Colorado Springs, and programs in small Colorado communities (by invitation only).

Hybl Fund:

Supports Olympic, Paralympic, and youth sports (by invitation only).

== Programs ==
El Pomar also operates several Community Stewardship programs.

=== American Council of Young Political Leaders ===
Each year, El Pomar hosts two delegations of international leaders, introducing them to various community and state leaders.

=== Awards for Excellence ===
This program recognizes Colorado nonprofit organizations by presenting them with cash awards for their work to support the people of Colorado. In addition, El Pomar recognizes individuals for their contributions to the nonprofit sector. Since its inception in 1989, the Awards for Excellence program has provided more than $5.8 million in grant support to more than 700 nonprofit organizations throughout Colorado.

=== El Pomar Fellowship ===
The Fellowship provides hands-on experience and a professional development curriculum for the next generation of Colorado leaders. Each Fellow gets a 360-degree view of the nonprofit sector. The two-year paid Fellowship for recent college graduates prepares individuals for roles as community leaders. More than 250 leaders have gone through the Fellowship since its inception in 1991.

=== El Pomar Internship ===
El Pomar's summer internship program provides an opportunity for college students with an interest in the nonprofit sector and leadership to gain work experience. During the 10–12 week experience, interns support the work of all departments within the Foundation.

=== Emerging Leaders Development ===
This program equips ethnic minorities with the training to broaden their impact on the community at-large. ELD connects local organizations with specially-trained leaders.

=== Empty Stocking Fund ===
In partnership with Colorado Springs' daily newspaper, The Gazette, El Pomar assists this holiday fundraising campaign that raises money for 20 health and human service agencies across the Pikes Peak region. Individuals and businesses raise over $1 million each holiday season.

The Gazette Charities-El Pomar Foundation's Empty Stocking Fund provides funding for the

- Care and Share Food Bank for Southern Colorado,
- West Side Cares, various programs for the needy.
- Catholic Charities of Central Colorado,
- Community Partnership for Child Development (CPCD),
- Griffith Centers for Children Chins Up,
- Lutheran Family Services,
- Mercy’s Gate,
- Mt. Carmel Veterans Service Center,
- National Alliance on Mental Illness (NAMI- Colorado Springs),
- Partners in Housing (PIH owns or co-owns 119 units of affordable housing with Rocky Mountain Community Land Trust and Greccio Housing),
- Peak Vista Community Health Centers,
- Pikes Peak Hospice & Palliative Care, Silver Key Senior Services (Empty Stocking Fund partner: Nursing Home Volunteer Program as well as age in place assistance),
- TESSA (serves more than 15,000 victims and includes a 32-bed safe house),
- The Place (runaway and homeless youth services),
- The Resource Exchange (TRE: helping those with intellectual and developmental disabilities [IDD] in El Paso, Park Teller and Pueblo counties),
- The Salvation Army,
- Tri-Lakes Cares, A largely grass-roots and volunteer-run organization providing food, housing, medical care, and financial assistance. The organization provides a food pantry and a Neighborhood Nurse Center in partnership with Penrose-St. Francis Health Services,
- YMCA of the Pikes Peak Region

=== Forum for Civic Advancement ===
Forum for Civic Advancement seeks and supports individuals interested in the civics of the Pikes Peak region. Throughout the year, Forum brings in speakers from across the country to provide insights on public policy issues affecting Colorado.

=== Military Affairs ===
With numerous military bases in Colorado Springs and Denver, El Pomar Foundation supports service members and their families throughout Colorado.

=== Nonprofit Executive Leadership ===
This four-day program offered to the Colorado nonprofit community in partnership with Colorado Springs' Center for Creative Leadership (CCL). CCL offers training to managers and leaders seeking developmental experiences.

=== Rocky Mountain Tax Seminar for Private Foundations ===
This seminar updates and informs managers and trustees of private foundations about tax laws that affect private foundations.

=== Pikes Peak Heritage Series ===
El Pomar's Pikes Peak Heritage Series increases knowledge and interest in a part of the region's economy and quality of life. Discussion topics focus on key challenges to how the region can preserve, protect, and promote natural assets.

=== El Pomar Foundation Wildland Fire Fund ===
The foundation provides funding and grants to organizations including the American Red Cross. In 2019 donations were for the Decker Fire In response to the 2020 Colorado fires (Cameron Peak Fire, CalWood Fire, Lefthand Canyon Fire and East Troublesome Fire) the foundation provided $50,000 in grants. Also in 2020 the Foundation collaborated with the United Way of Pueblo County, and the Colorado Housing and Finance Authority to help those who were displaced by a fire at the Fenix Apartment complex.

=== El Pomar grants ===
In 2018, in response to the July and August storms, the Foundation provided two grants totaling $500,000. The El Paso County’s Fraud Investigation Unit determined eligibility. El Paso County finance representatives issued on-site checks from a special account.

== Regional partnerships ==
With the intent to increase impact and establish connections throughout the entire state, El Pomar created Regional Partnerships to help communities identify and address local needs. The program convenes community leaders into 11 Regional Councils that advise El Pomar's Trustees and recommend multi-year grants to address the needs in their home communities. More than 70 community leaders make up 11 Regional Councils representing all 64 Colorado counties.

Regional Council members represent the business, nonprofit, and public sectors. Each Council member comes to El Pomar with an established record of community engagement and the ability to provide firsthand information about the needs in the local region. Each Council provides direct grant recommendations to El Pomar’s Trustees, with the potential for a combined annual impact of more than $2 million across the state. Since 2003, the Councils have invested more than $22 million in their communities.

== Penrose House Conference Center ==
The former home of El Pomar founders Spencer and Julie Penrose now serves as a nonprofit conference and education center owned and operated by El Pomar Foundation. Penrose House serves as an education and conference center available exclusively for the nonprofit community. Penrose House is not intended to host the routine or regularly scheduled activities of nonprofit organizations, but is offered as a venue for strategic meetings and conferences.

Use of Penrose House space is provided at no cost for qualified organizations and requests:

- Qualified organizations are 501(c)(3) nonprofit organizations and government agencies
- Qualified requests are strategic or productive in nature (vs. social, networking, celebratory, or recognition-oriented)

== Sources ==
El Pomar. (n.d.). Retrieved from https://www.elpomar.org/

Noel, T. J., & Norman, C. M. (2002). Pikes Peak Partnership: The Penroses and the Tutts. University Press of Colorado.
