= Heller Center =

- Location: Colorado Springs, Colorado
- Established: Deeded to Colorado University May 1997
- Website: heller.uccs.edu

The Heller Center at Eagle Rock, Colorado Springs, Colorado is a nature preserve bequeathed to the University of Colorado Colorado Springs to support local arts and humanities education. It was donated to the University in 1997 by Dorothy Heller.

== History ==
The 34-acre (140,000 m^{2}) land parcel is located in the pinion-pine grasslands at Austin Bluffs, settling directly below the rocky outcrop of Eagle Rock. Owned by Dottie and Lawrence Heller, the homestead was called "Yawn Valley". Lawrence was an artist and Dotty was one of the first women to work for the Colorado Springs Police Department.

The homestead, including its extensive art collection, was deeded to the University of Colorado's Board of Regent in May 1997 and intended to support local arts and humanities education. Geography field study classes are held at the Heller Ranch, where students practice birdsong-listening, wildflower identification, and dendrochronological investigations.

The Heller Center consists of a ranch house, guest house, and art gallery, surrounded by lilacs. Wild prairie, with some invasive vegetation like the classically pyramidal juniper tree, extends past the Hellers' architectural landscape. Further southwards are sculpture gardens set onto the front lawns of an old art colony which appeared along Stanton Road when the Eagle Rock suburban neighborhood was first developed. Since the university was established in 1965 at the former Cragmor Sanatorium on the Bluffs’ southern slope, campus development continues to edge around toward Eagle Rock's precincts. Far to the south, the skyscrapers of downtown Colorado Springs are visible.

== Geomorphology ==
Eagle Rock participates in the Austin Bluffs area's soil type of the "Travessilla-Rock outcrop complex," as mapped at the scale of 1:24,000-ft., (ref. USDA, 1974.) The Eagle Rock cliff resulted from several long cycles of mountain-building (orogenies) followed by erosion. Heat and pressure energies that had thrust up the mountains produced igneous rock, such as the Pikes Peak pink granite, which eventually degraded. Natural forces dispersed and deposited particles of the rock debris. Over time, the sediment collected and consolidated into new sandstone at the Garden of the Gods, producing a geologic layer known as the Dakota Formation. The Dakota sedimented sandstone later came to be inundated by the waters of a shallow inland sea. From some 66 to 70 million years ago and episodically continuing for millions of years, uplift from the Laramide Orogeny exposed the old sandstone seabed, by tilting up to 90-degree angles the steep red megaliths now visible in the Garden of the Gods. Portions of the Dakota Formation again cycled into episodes of erosion, allowing a detritus of coarse-grained sedimentary sand to be displaced some three miles (5 km) eastwards, to land at the site which is now known as Austin Bluffs. The feldspar-rich sedimented particles of "arkose" sand consolidated into new sandstone, i.e. the Dawson Formation, which shows Eagle Rock's characteristic color, ranging from grey to reddish. At Eagle Rock, the sandstone cliff visible today has survived further erosion for a longer time, than the less-resistant background soils could have withstood. Eagle Rock lies exposed to view, as a weather-sculpted geological form.
