= San Luis Ranch School =

- 2555 North Chelton Road; Colorado Springs, Colorado; United States

Information
- Type: College preparatory ranch school
- Established: 1889
- Founder: Bessie Henry
- Closed: 1951

San Luis Ranch School was a college preparatory ranch school for girls in Colorado Springs, Colorado established in 1889.

== History ==
The school was founded by Bessie Henry, an educator from Philadelphia, as a co-ed day school located on what is now the Colorado College campus at 126 East Cache La Poudre Street, first called Miss Henry's School and later San Luis School. In 1917, the school became an open air school, holding all of its classes outside. Henry remained the principal through 1921, then Marie Fox Potter became principal (styled as headmistress) in 1922.

The school purchased the property at 2555 North Chelton Road, at the base of Austin Bluffs, and expanded the San Luis Ranch School into an exclusive girls' college preparatory school. In 1942, Mrs. Ena Curry became principal of the school. The school operated at the Chelton Road location until closing in 1951.

The former school site on Chelton Road was purchased in 1960 by the Benedictine Sisters of Mount St. Scholastica Community of Atchison, Kansas and developed into the girls' preparatory school Benet Hill Academy, which operated from 1963 to 1982. The site currently serves as Benet Hill Monastery.
