= Old North End Historic District (Colorado Springs, Colorado) =

Historic district in Colorado, United States

- Old North Historic District
- U.S. National Register of Historic Places
- U.S. Historic district
- Colorado State Register of Historic Properties No. 5EP.333
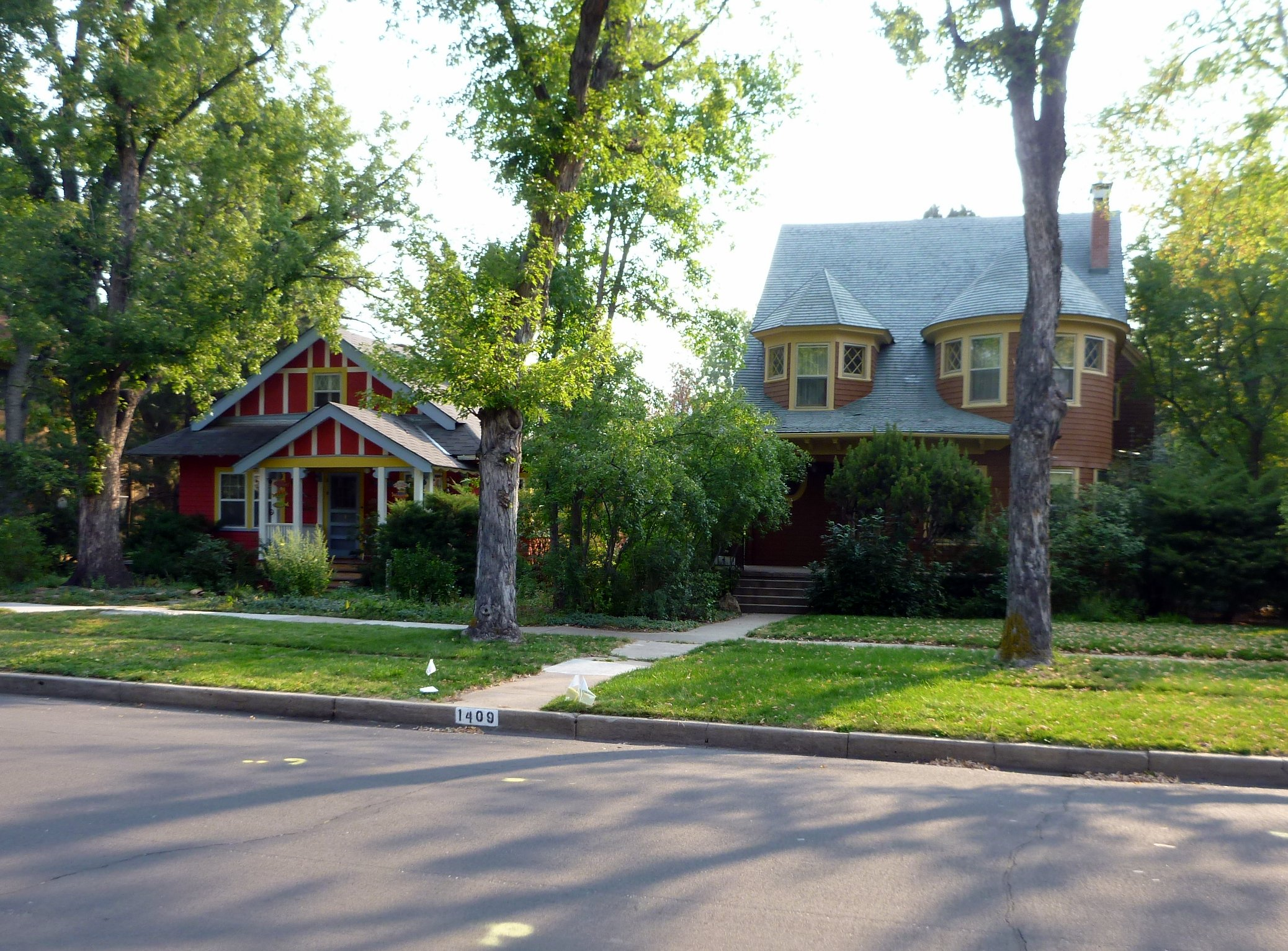

- Location within Colorado Location within the United States
- Location: Neighborhood in the northern section of downtown Colorado Springs, Colorado
- Coordinates: 38°51′27″N 104°49′21″W
- Website: oldnorthend.org
- NRHP reference No.: 82001017
- CSRHP No.: 5EP.333

Significant dates
- Added to NRHP: December 17, 1982
- Designated HD: 82001017
- Designated CSRHP: 1982

Old North End Historic District of Colorado Springs, Colorado is located north of Colorado College (Note: Colorado College was the northmost area of Colorado Springs through the 1880s.) between Monument Valley Park, an alley between Weber and Nevada Streets, and Uintah and Lilac Streets. It was called North End Historic District until September 2015 when the district boundaries were expanded and the neighborhood was renamed.

The residential area was developed for middle and upper-class people in the late-nineteenth century. The architecture includes Spanish Colonial Revival, Georgian Revival, Mission architecture as well as more contemporary Modern Movement, International Style and Bungalow styles. The houses, built between 1885 and 1965 are generally in good condition.

History Colorado, which register the district as a historic place, says of the neighborhood, "The architectural character of the district is also indicative of the various periods of growth in Colorado Springs, from the late-nineteenth century gold boom through the post-World War II population influx. In addition, a number of the district's homes were designed by well-known, influential architects of the day." It was registered by the National Register of Historic Places in 1982.

== History ==
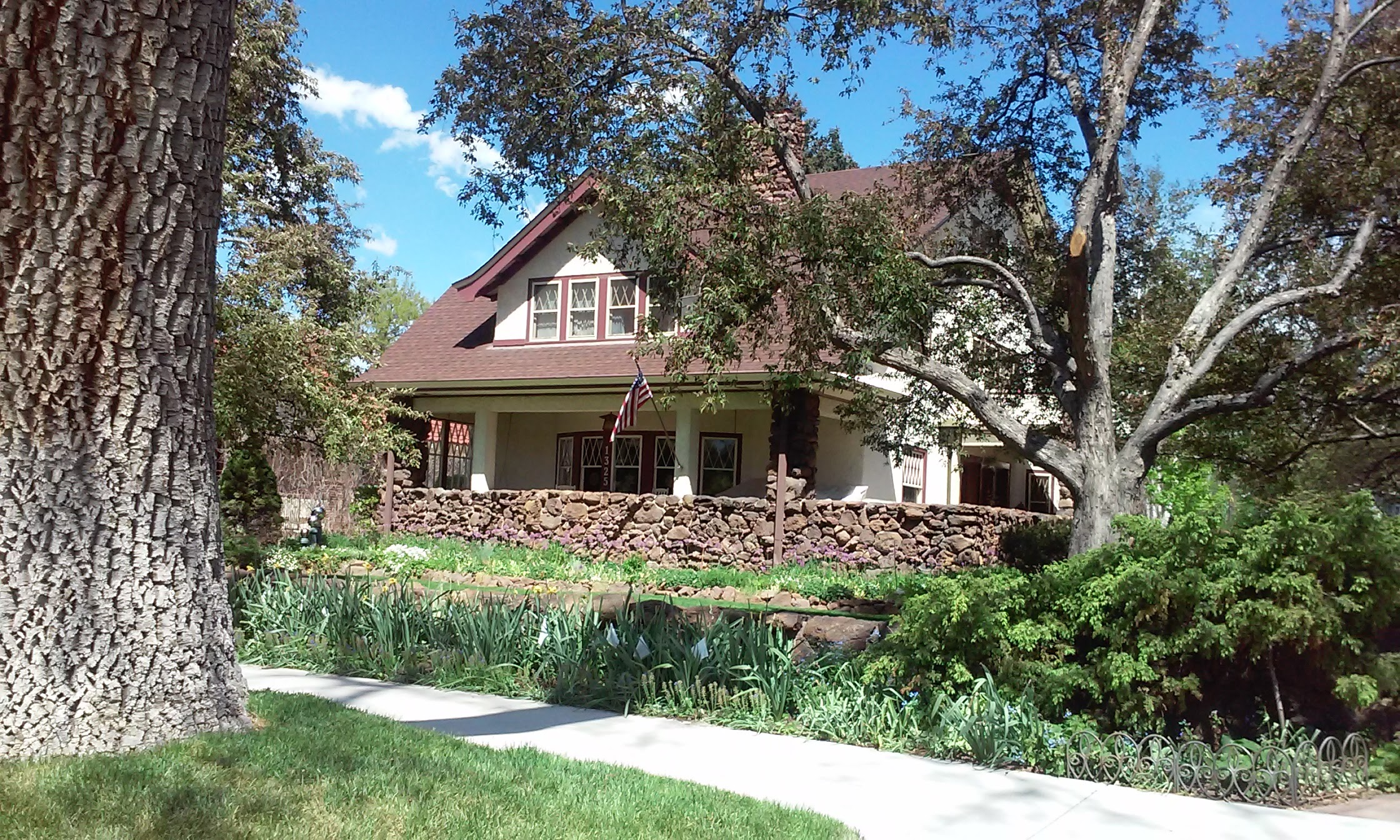
House in Old North End Historic District

The first building constructed in the Old North End was a house for female students of Colorado College by its president, Edward Payson Tenney. Called the Columbian Club, the three-story Victorian house was built about 1881 with a covered porch, large dormer windows, and a steeple at Cascade Avenue and Columbia Street, four blocks north of the campus building, Cutler Hall. It burned down on January 1, 1884 while its occupants were away during the Christmas holiday.

In the 1880s, Tenney built the first house for the president of the university on Cascade Avenue, north of San Rafael, the northern boundary of the city at that time. It is the current side of Loomis Hall, which was constructed in the mid-1950s. Colorado College, led by Tenney, purchased land as an investment in what became the Old North End. Called New Massachusetts, named for his New England background, the enterprise was not profitable due to the very slow growth of the city at that time. The college sold its interest in the endeavor at a loss and fired Tenney. By 1888, the Old North End district was primarily grassland with a few houses.

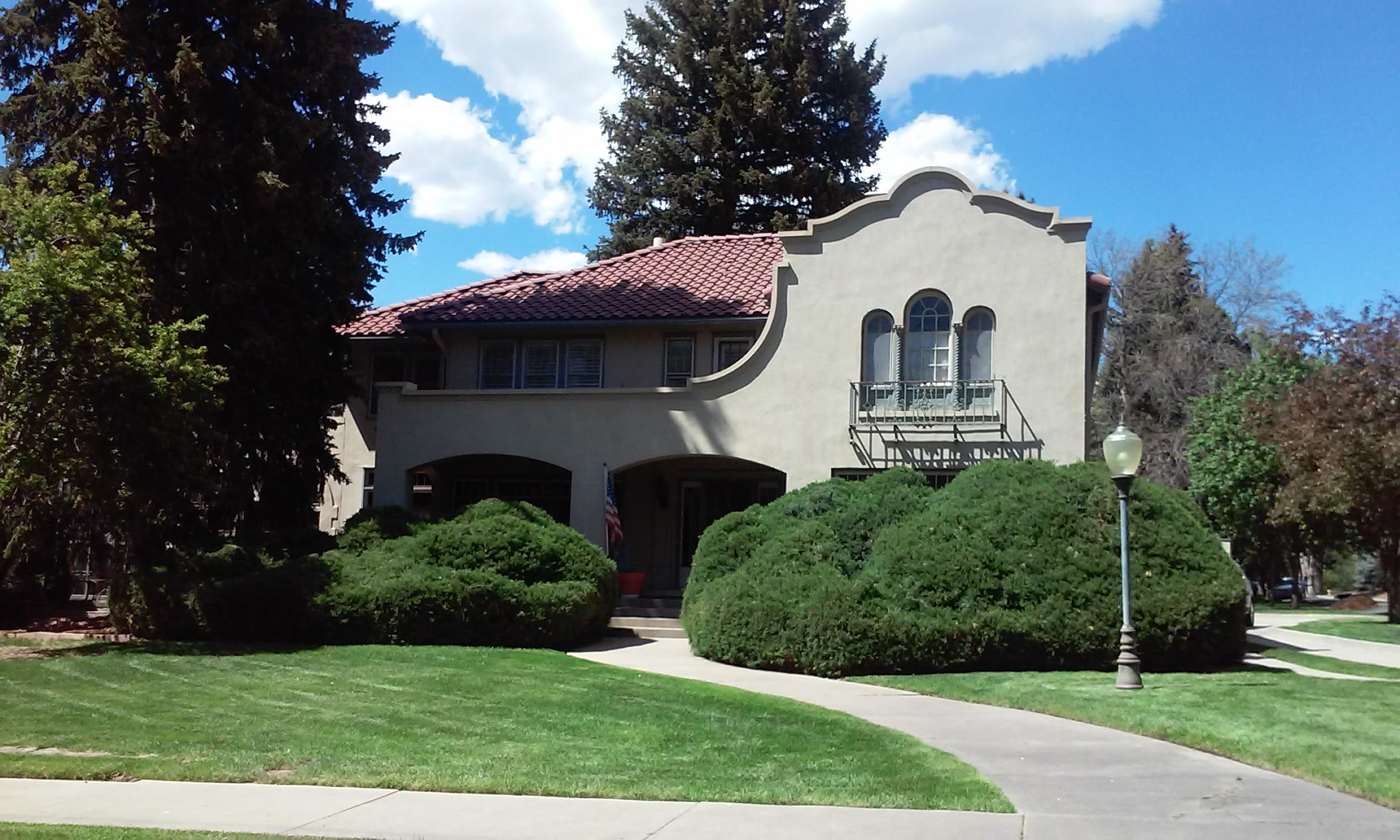
House in Old North End Historic District

Many homes were built in the neighborhood during a period of significant growth between 1890 and 1910, largely due to the success of the gold mines in Cripple Creek and Victor and resulting industry in the city of Colorado Springs. There were more than 400 mining companies and three mining exchanges established in Colorado Springs. Colorado Springs Mining Exchange became successful, trading "more shares than any other exchange in the world." The population of the city doubled between 1890 and 1900.

Architects Charles Thomas, Thomas MacLaren, E.C.G Robinson, Nicholas Van den Arend, and Douglas & Hetherington designed Tudor, Colonial Revival, Queen Anne and other style houses. Residents included the middle class, like gold stock brokers, Cripple Creek area mine manages, doctors, and judges. Some of the houses were built with sleeping porches for people who had moved to the dry, mountain climate of Colorado Springs to cure their tuberculosis, like Marshall Sprague. The 1200 and 1300 blocks of Wood Avenue, nicknamed Millionaires Row, was the site of mansions to many of the 50 North End millionaires, like mine like mine owners Nelson B. Williams and James Ferguson Burns who owned the Williams Burns Mansion (later converted to apartments) at 1315 Wood Avenue and O.C. Townsend. Before it was renamed, the street was named Earl's Court.

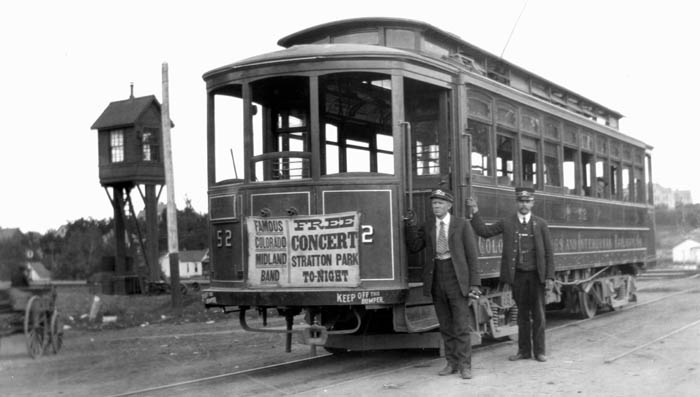
Colorado Springs & Interurban Railroad car, 1907 or 1908

Streetcars, operated by the Colorado Springs and Interurban Railway, provided service for the North End on the main north / south route on Tejon Street, on North Weber from downtown to Fontanero, and eastward on Fontanero. Having transitioned from horse-drawn cars, there were 44 electric trolleys in 1900. Streetcars operated until the 1930s.

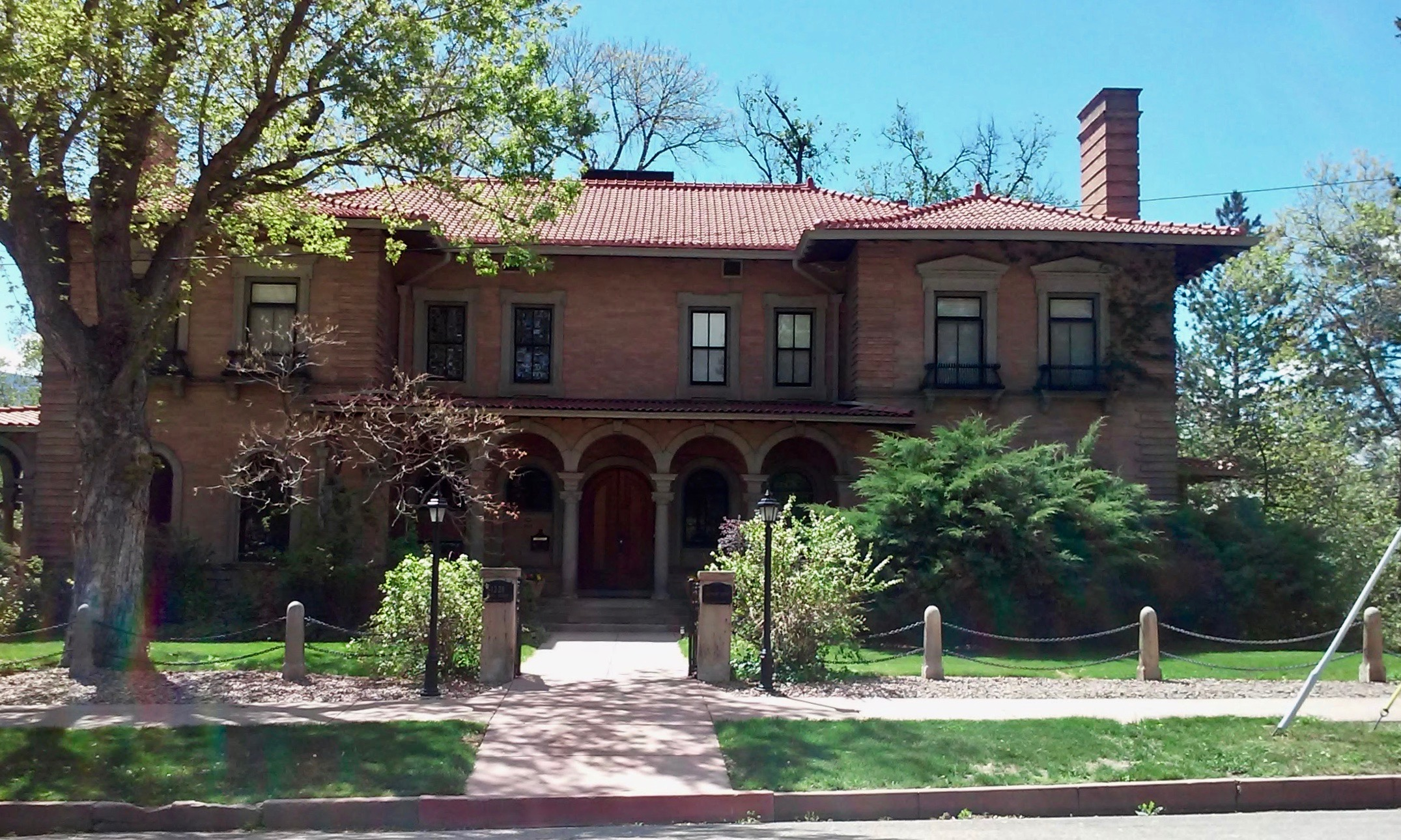
Stewart House

The 1200 block of Wood Avenue is the site of the second president's house for Colorado College and Stewart House, which was donated to the institution by Philip B. Stewart. Also on the block is the former house of Alice Bemis Taylor who was a significant benefactor to the school. Taylor Dining Hall, now a theater, was named for her and Bemis Hall was named for her father. Charles L. Tutt Sr.'s house at Uintah and Cascade was donated to the college and is now the Tutt Alumni House.

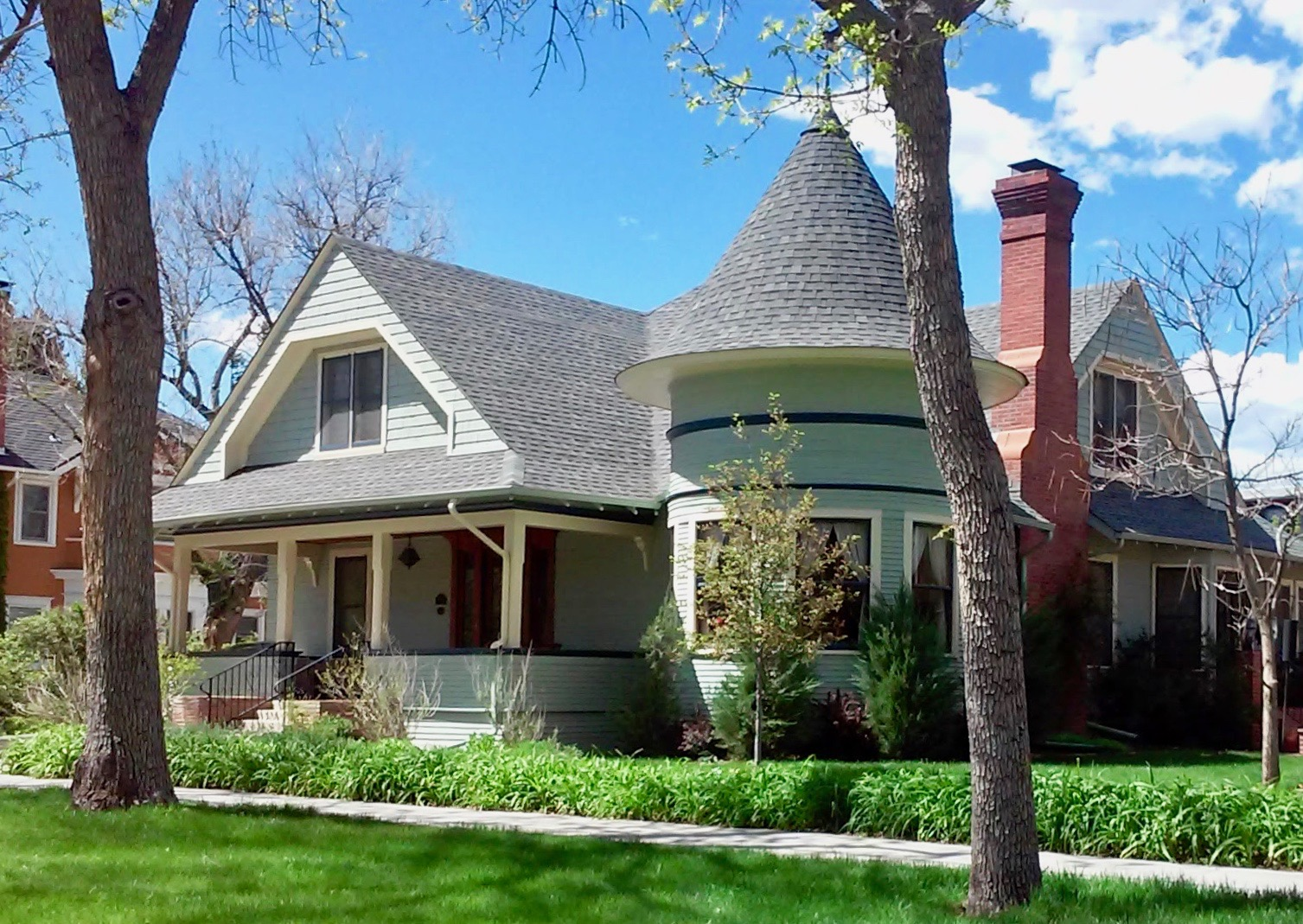
House in Old North End Historic District

The neighborhood has remained stable into and through the 20th century due to the growth of Colorado College, Glockner and then Penrose Hospitals, and businesses and the court in downtown Colorado Springs. Homeowners have included physicians from the hospitals, college professors, lawyers, and businesspeople.

During World War II, apartments were created in garages, basements, and entire houses, which were used for residences for military stationed at training facilities at Camp Carson and Peterson Field.

== Medical care ==
=== Tuberculosis ===
In the late 19th century, people afflicted with tuberculosis came to Colorado Springs, one of several Rocky Mountain locations, for its high altitude and cool, dry air. In the North End, there were convalescent homes and the Glockner Tuberculosis Sanatorium. A fully restored tuberculosis hut, or tent cottage, and its early 20th century furnishings that was used by people who came to the Colorado Springs area to cure their tuberculosis is located at the corner of Jackson Street and Cascade Avenue.

=== Glockner Tuberculosis Sanatorium ===
Marie Gwynne Glockner opened the Glockner Tuberculosis Sanatorium at 2200 N. Tejon in 1890 as a memorial to her husband, Dr. Albert Glockner, who had died of tuberculosis at 31 years of age. The first superintendent was Dr. Boswell P. Anderson, a former Colorado Midland Railway physician. In 1893, Glockner gave the sanatorium to the Sisters of Charity of Cincinnati, who were brought in for their care-giving and professional skills. It was the Glockner Sanatorium and Training School for Nurses by 1916 and the Glockner Sanatorium and Hospital in 1940. Glockner evolved over the years into Penrose Hospital. The Glockner Hospital was razed in 1959 for the construction of a new Penrose Hospital building, costing $10 million.

== Gallery ==
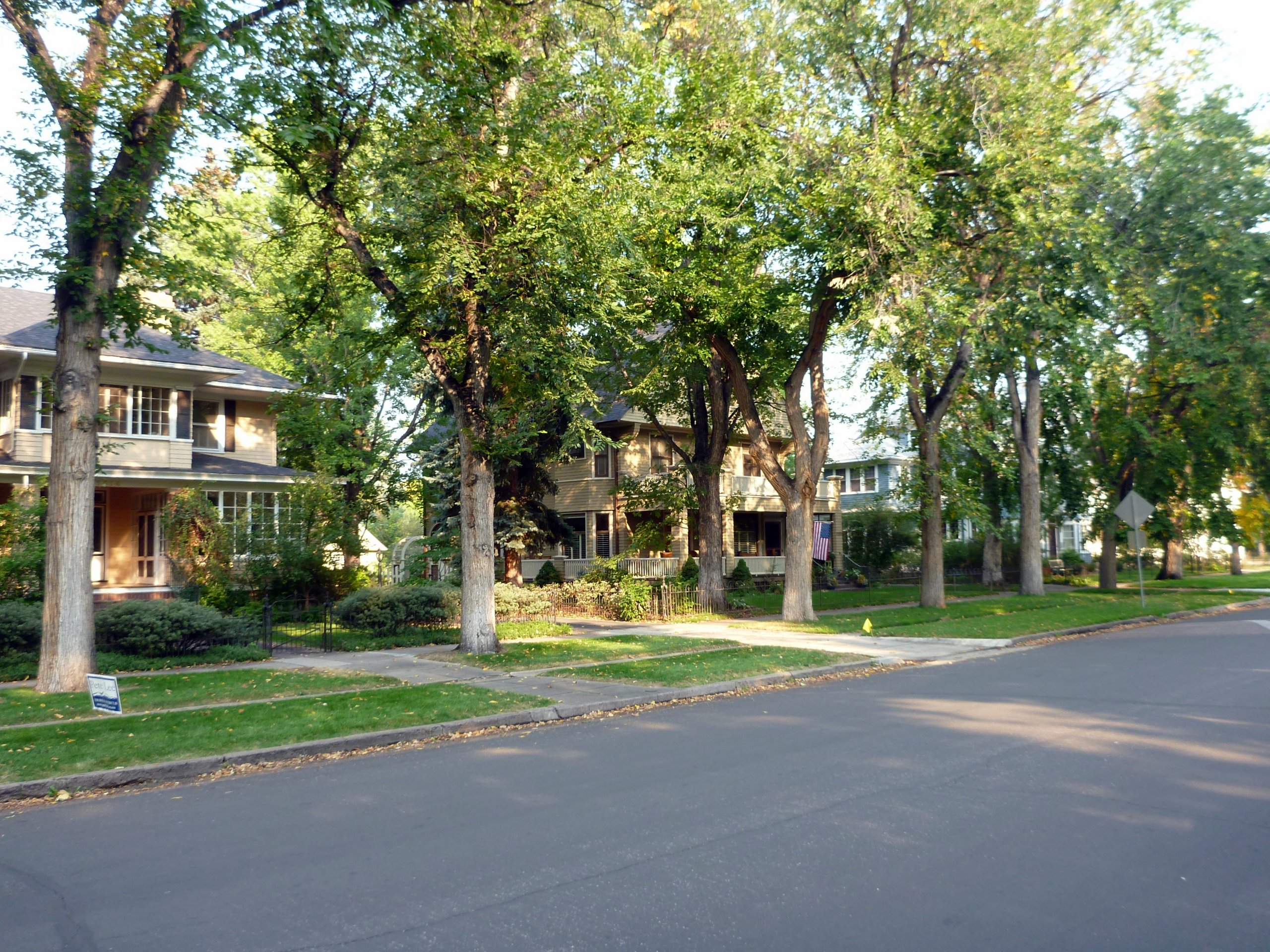
Old North End Historic District

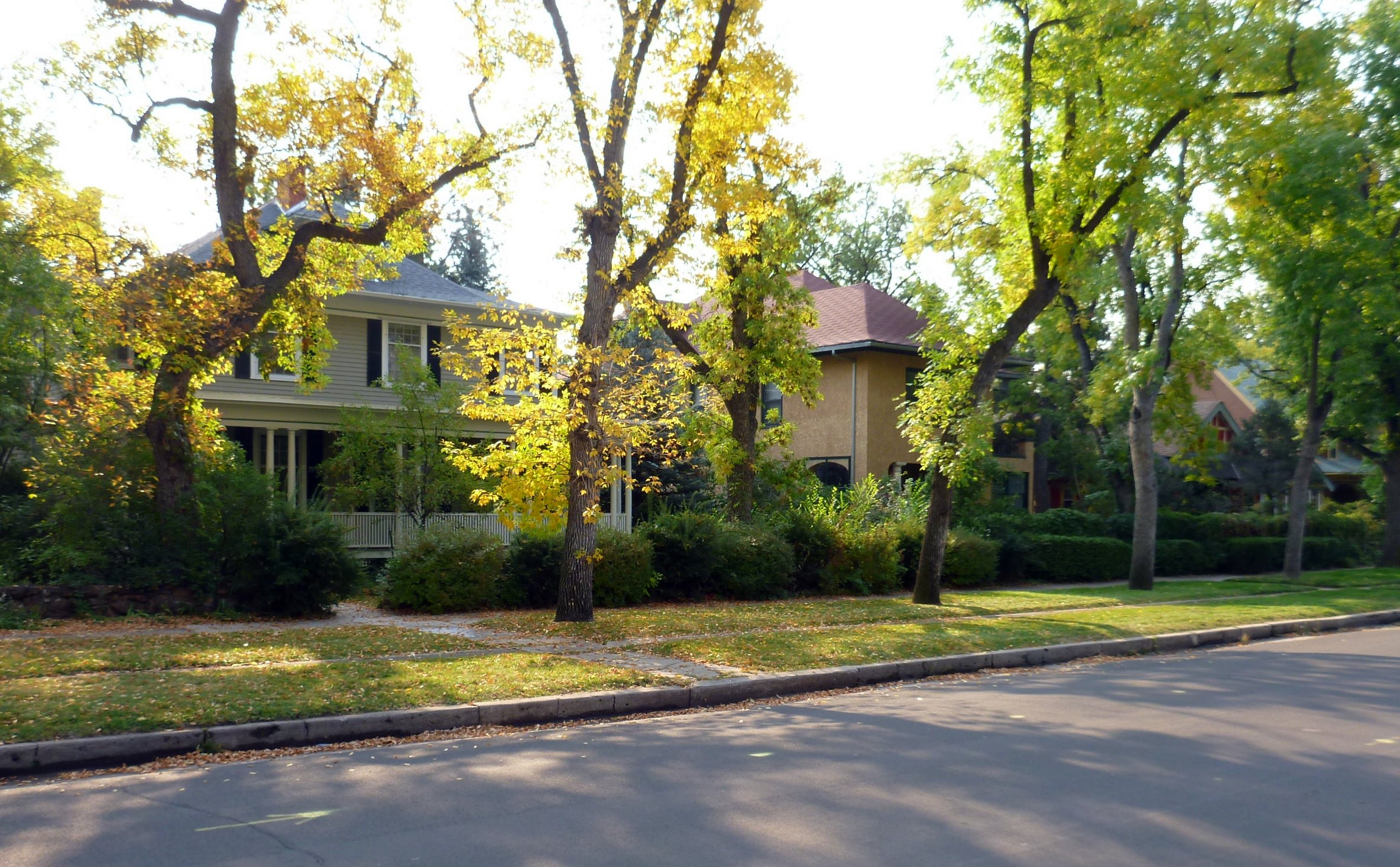
1400 block of Wood Avenue, Old North End Historic District

== Sources ==
- Robert D. Loevy (March 1, 2010). "Ye Complete History of the Old North End Neighborhood in Colorado Springs, Colorado" (PDF). Colorado College.
- Tom Sherlock (2013). Colorado's Healthcare Heritage: A Chronology of the Nineteenth and Twentieth Centuries Volume One - 1800-1899. iUniverse. ISBN 978-1-4759-8025-7.
