= Mining in Colorado Springs, Colorado =

In the mid-19th century, Colorado Springs was a center of mining industry activity. Coal was mined in 50 mines in the area and towns, now annexed to Colorado Springs, were established to support residents of the coal mining industry.

It was the home to gold and silver mine investors, like Winfield Scott Stratton and William Jackson Palmer. The Midland Terminal and Colorado Midland Railways were established in Colorado Springs to transported metals and ores and people from mountain towns. Once in Colorado Springs, ore was smelted there. People and goods were transported on the Railways to and from Colorado Springs, as well as on the Denver & Rio Grande Railroad.

Mine workers typically lived on the west side of town, like Old Colorado City, while investors lived in the Old North End.

== Gold ==
During the Pike's Peak Gold Rush, Old Colorado City was founded in 1859, based upon the vision of it being a major supply hub via Ute Pass for the new gold mines in South Park, the Upper Arkansas River area, and Blue River.

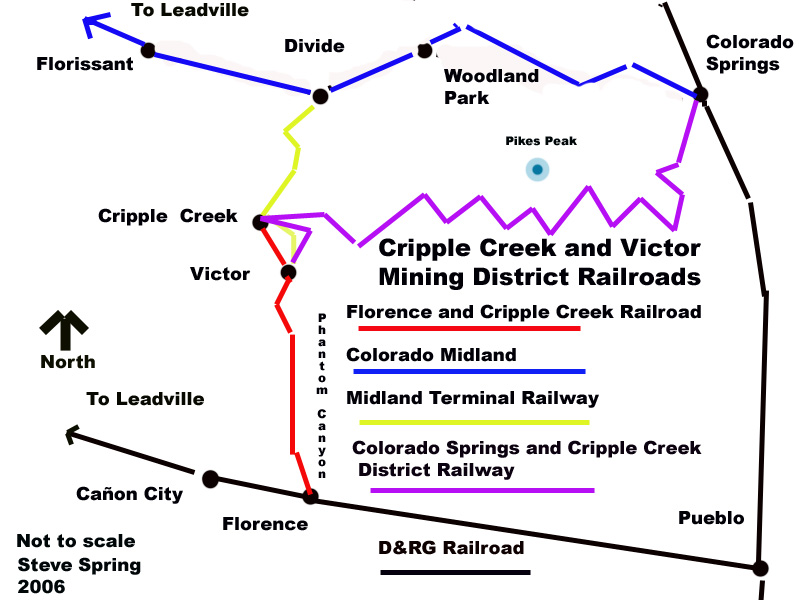
Colorado Springs and Cripple Creek District Railway, Colorado Midland Railway, and Midland Terminal Railway operated between Colorado Springs and Cripple Creek. Colorado Midland traveled further west to other mining towns.

There was a significant tie between Colorado Springs and Cripple Creek, particularly among investors and people who settled in Cripple Creek. Mining exchange businesses were established in downtown Colorado Springs. Colorado Springs Mining Stock Association was founded about 1886 to trade stock of Cripple Creek mines, some of which grew between 1,000% and 10,000% by 1893. It traded stocks "in almost every state and country in the world." John W. Proudfit & Co., founded in 1890, was the first organization in Colorado Springs to buy and sell mining stocks. It had office in three cities in Colorado and in London. The Crosby-Ehrich Syndicate was a mining stock and investment brokerage house, with representatives coordinating transactions with Cripple Creek businesses.

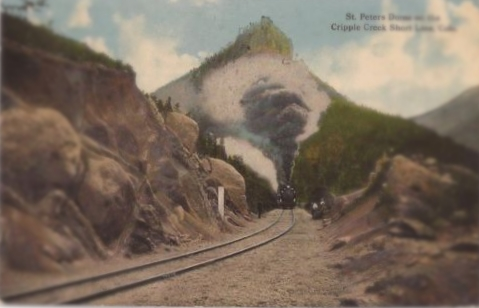
Colorado Springs and Cripple Creek District Railway at St. Peter's Dome, 1910s

When gold was discovered in Cripple Creek and Victor in 1890, some of the Colorado Midland Railway owners formed the Midland Terminal Railroad, a standard gauge spur line from Divide to Cripple Creek, which allowed for passenger travel to and from Cripple Creek, shipment of equipment into the area, and the transport of ore to processing mills in Old Colorado City beginning in 1895. Colorado Springs was a transfer point for people and goods to and from other areas of the country via the Denver & Rio Grande Railroad. The Colorado Springs and Cripple Creek District Railway completed an alternate route to Cripple Creek and Victor, traveling through the mountains south of Pikes Peak, called the Short Line in 1901. It was used to transport cargo, as well for sightseeing. In 1920, the tracks were abandoned the resulting road is the current Gold Camp Road.

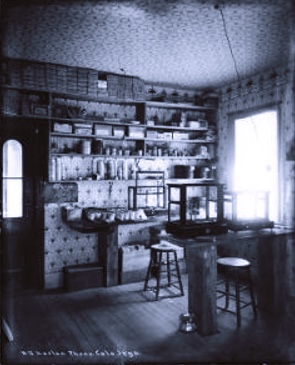
Andrew James Harlan, Assaying office in Colorado Springs, 1915, Pikes Peak Library District digital collections

Assay offices were established in Colorado Springs to test the purity of precious metals.

In the 1890s, the metal ore smelting businesses were established in Old Colorado City. Golden Cycle Mining and Reduction Company, involved in coal and gold mining, operated a custom mill, treating up to 40,000 tons of Cripple Creek ore each month. The mill had rolls, roasting furnaces, and cyanide equipment.

In 1900, Cripple Creek was the world's second richest gold camp, bringing in $20 million a year. Three years later, mine industry workers went on strike for better working conditions and higher wages. This involved people that worked in smelting firms, mills, and in mines. After people had died and property was damaged during the strike, the strikers were unable to make an agreement with their employers during the Colorado Labor Wars (1903–1904).

The mining business faltered during World War I, when workers supported the war effort. It also slowed during the Great Depression (1930s).

== Silver and lead ==
Ore was also sent, such as from Leadville, to Colorado Springs, where was processed for silver and lead.

== Coal ==
=== Colorado Springs Coalfield ===
The Colorado Springs Coalfield is located in the southwestern part of the Denver Basin, where the lower part of the Laramie Formation ranges from 150 to 200 feet thick, and the upper part ranges from 100 to 150 feet thick. The lower part of the Laramie in the Colorado Springs coal field includes alternating beds of very fine to fine-grained sandstone, claystone, and coal, whereas the upper part is composed primarily of claystone with thin interbeds of fine-grained sandstone.

In 1910, Marcus I. Goldman designated three coal beds in the lower part of the formation as coal beds A–C in ascending order; other unnamed thin and lenticular coal beds are also present in the area. Most of the mines in the Colorado Springs coal field produced coal from the A and B coal beds. Coal bed A is present from 30 to 65 feet above the base of the formation, and as a single bed, is as thick as 20 feet locally. Elsewhere in the coal field, coal bed A splits into two coal beds separated by about 8 feet of rock; in more extreme cases, the bed splits into a series of four to five thin coal beds separated by rock partings. Coal bed B is present from 25 to 50 feet above coal bed A, with massive sandstone typically separating the two coal beds. Coal bed B is as much as 13 feet thick locally, although the bed is more typically 5 feet thick or less throughout much of the Colorado Springs coal field. Coal bed C is lenticular and in places is absent. Where coal bed C is present, it lies from 20 to 50 feet stratigraphically above coal bed B and generally is less than 2 feet thick.

By 1922, there were nine active coal mines, Pikeview, Keystone, City #1 and #2, Old Patterson, Danville, Cottonwood, Altitude, and Black Mariah. That year, workers of the Pikes Peak Coal Company (owner of Pikeview mines) complained of working conditions, particularly the smoke generated by firing shots to clear the mines. This is a common problem that the state had not been able to resolve. The State Mine Inspection Department reported that the company had found a solution; The shot firer would only fire shots when the mine had been vacated.

Over the years, there were more than 16 million tons of coal mined from the Colorado Springs coal field.

=== Mining ===
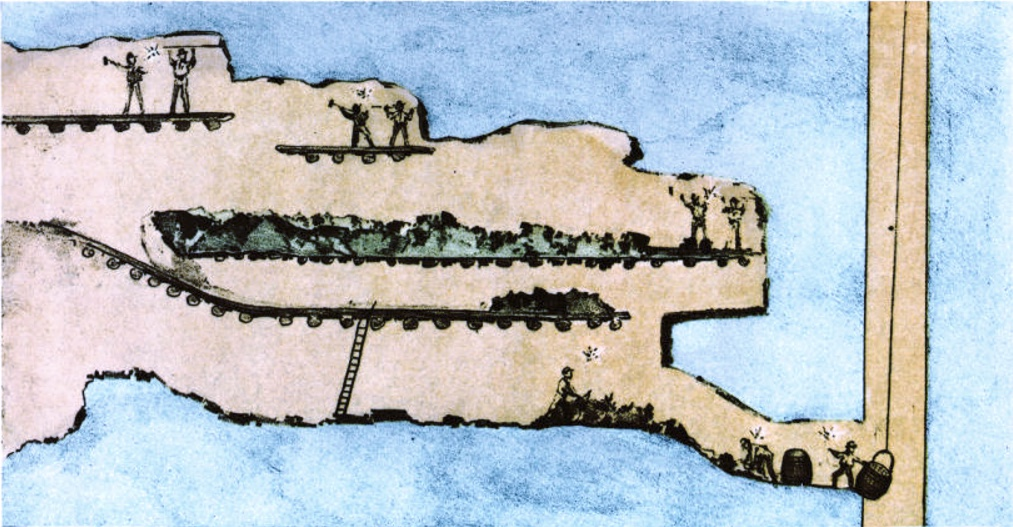
Shaft or Lode Mining, lithograph, 1866, lithograph by Julius Bien, Pikes Peak Library District collection. The interior of a coal mine shaft, depicting workers and mining activities.

External images
- Inactive Coal Mine Data and Subsidence Information for El Paso County (map)
- Colorado Springs Central / Cragmor mines (map)
- Rockrimmon / Pikeview mines (map)

Beginning about 1859, the area was mined for coal. There were 50 coal mines in the Colorado Springs, mostly in the Rockrimmon and Cragmor - Colorado Springs Country Club area. Mining in the Rockrimmon area occurred between 250 and 500 feet (76 and 152 m) below the surface, while the Cragmor mines were shallow, some only 30 feet (9.1 m) below the surface. Depending upon the depth of the coal bed, the mines were entered through vertical mine shafts or through inclined openings.

The mines in the Rockrimmon area were the Corley, Columbine, Knights of Industry, three Pikeview, and the Klondike mines, the deepest of which was the Klondike mine at 500 feet. The Cragmor mines were the City Mine, the Altitude, Williamsville Mine, Curtis Mine, Patterson Mine, the Climax mines, the Conley, Busy Bee, and the Danville. The Country Club area mines were City #3, Keystone, New Keystone, Rapson, Austin Bluffs, El Paso, and Unknown mines. Even further southeast, near Academy and Constitution were City #4, Tudor, and Cardiff mines.

Coal was mined using the "room and pillar" method, in which areas of unmined coal acted as pillars while coal was removed from the shafts, creating rooms. Sometimes, rather than leaving the pillar for support, the supporting coal was removed. The seams of coal was one to fourteen feet deep in the Colorado Springs area.

=== Subsidence and other hazards ===
Subsidence process and effects

Of the city's 50 abandoned mines, 22 have become hazardous because they were "very shallow mines"—some no more than 30 feet (9.1 m) below the surface—that are now subject to sinking under developed land. In a study of mine subsidence in the Colorado Springs coal field by the Dames and Moore consulting firm in 1985, trough-like subsidence over room-and-pillar mines was observed to be irregular, and the authors of that report interpreted that the interior of any given subsidence trough would likely undergo varying periods of tension and compression, depending on the timing required for failure of existing coal pillars and supports. They also suggested that as overburden above the room-and-pillar mine decreases, trough subsidence would primarily be a series of sinkholes resulting from the collapse of mine rooms with scattered larger depressions (troughs) forming from the general failure of pillars or mine floor over the larger areas.

Many of the hazardous, abandoned mines are near Cragmor, such as Cragmor Country Club Estates that had about 3,000 residents in the late 1980s. There were more than 2,400 crack and sinkholes in the Cragmor Country Club Estates area, while there were only a total of seven in other areas of Colorado Springs during a 1985 study supervised by the Colorado Mined Land Reclamation Division. In 2005, there was a collapse on Country Club Circle that threatened five houses. Because it is the most hazardous subsidence area in the state, a study was conducted in 2008 using Geophones to locate mining tunnels. The plan is to fill in voids with sand and gravel.

Strategies for mitigating the risk due to sinkholes and subsidence include filling the voids, which can be costly due to the amount of material needed, and construction techniques so that structures are not prone to sinking. Strategies for managing the risk include insurance for subsidence and sinkholes.

There are also hazards due to mine openings, drainage of metals or other pollutants from the mines into groundwater, or fires within mines or the outside waste banks. There are no known occurrences of groundwater contamination or fires, but they are ongoing risks. In April 1979, the surface plug of the 500-foot Klondike mine shaft at Woodman Road and I-25 had deteriorated and was reopened. Two mine opening hazards remain at the Cragmor-Country Club and the Wilson Ranch area.

=== Real estate development ===
By the 1950s, coal was no longer mined in the Cragmor area and land was developed for the construction of about 3,500 houses, which was completed in the early 1960s. Then, the initial instances of subsidence began, such as one on Mount View Lane in 1963. In another case, a dog died when the earth sunk in the backyard beneath a dog who became trapped in the falling dirt and died due to suffocation. In 1979, earth fell through an old mine shaft by a fourplex on Magnolia Street in the Cragmor area, forcing the evacuation of the residents and requiring a means to brace the building. That year, subsidence resulted in a 12 by 7 feet (3.7 by 2.1 m) sinkhole in the park. It was discovered that 31 feet (9.4 m) below the surface of the park were mine shafts and the pool was slipping into a shafts. The sinkhole was filled and the pool was braced when tons of concrete were poured into the shafts.

== Limestone ==
Limestone was mined from the Pikeview Quarry, which began operations in 1905. Queens Canyon Quarry, north of Garden of the Gods, was mined for limestone from 1958 to 1990, creating a noticeable gash or scar in the Queens Canyon Quarry. A reclamation effort, led by Greg Francis, resulted in "resculpting" the terrain to support ongoing landscaping and tree planting efforts. On August 1, 2003, the hillside was renamed Greg Francis Bighorn Sheep Habitat in honor of Francis, who died October 2002. A statue of a bighorn sheep stands on Greg Francis Bighorn Sheep Habitat in recognition of the herd of 65 bighorns (in 2003) and Greg Francis, hundreds of volunteers, and efforts by Castle Concrete to reintroduce Rocky Mountain juniper trees, native grasses, and small piñon to the hills.

== Cheyenne Mining District ==
The Cheyenne Mining District, located on Cheyenne Mountain, was the site of the Little Suzie gold mine established in the 1870s and silver and mineral mining that began in 1883. Eureka mine, Cather Springs, and Duffield near St. Peter's Dome on Gold Camp Road was mined for minerals, including Fluorite, cryolite, topaz, smoky quartz, fayalite, galena, and microcline.

== Museums ==
=== Western Museum of Mining & Industry ===
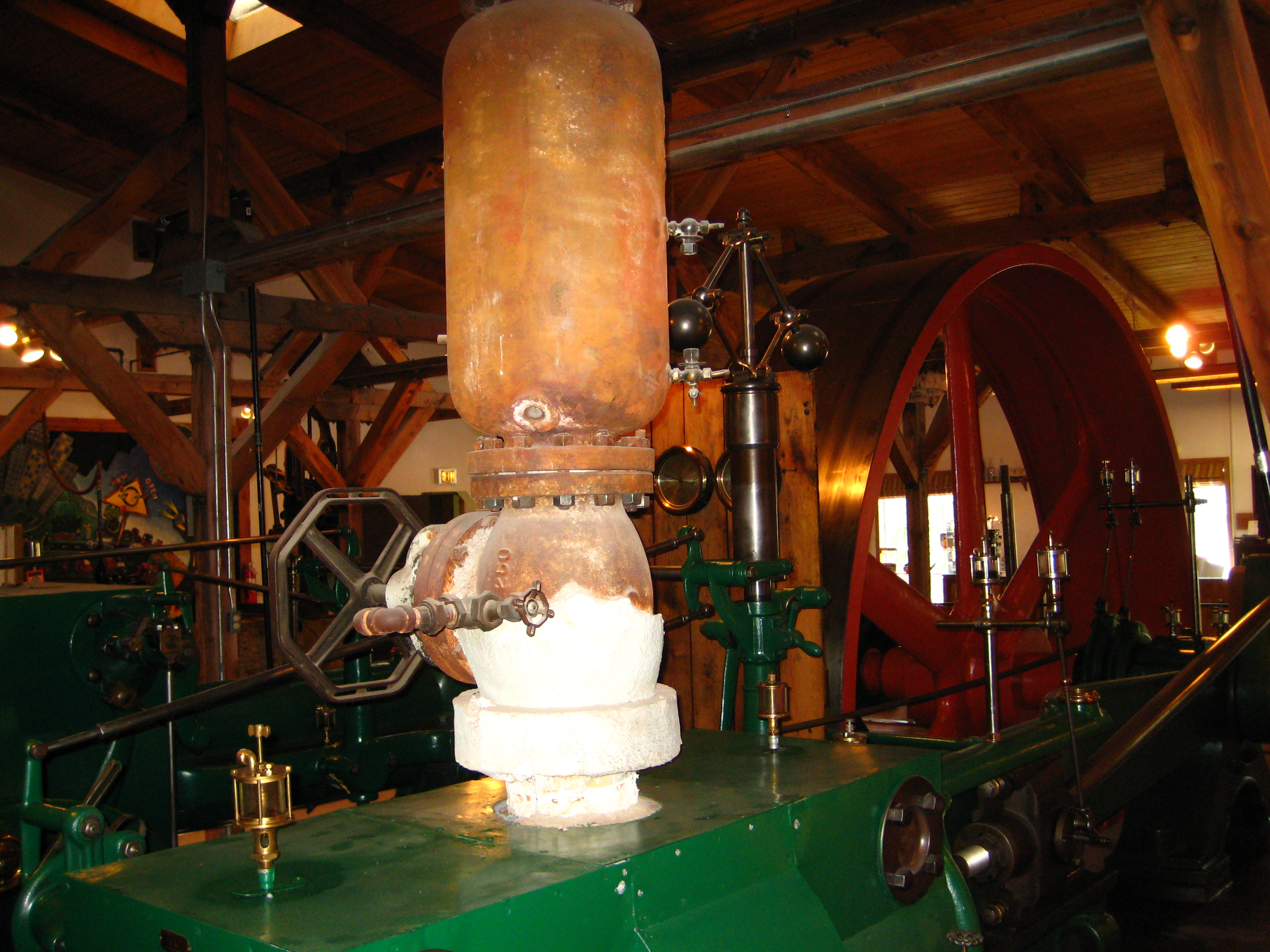
Corliss Steam Engine, Western Museum of Mining & Industry

The Western Museum of Mining & Industry is a museum, dedicated to the mining history and industrial technology of the western United States, with antique mining equipment and steam engines.

=== Colorado Springs Pioneers Museum ===
The Colorado Springs Pioneers Museum also has exhibits about the city's mining and railroad history.
