= Dhruba K. Bhattacharyya =

Indian computer scientist

Dhruba K Bhattacharyya
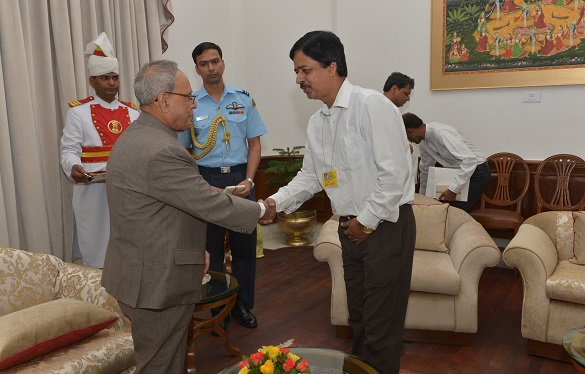
- Prof. Dhruba K Bhattacharyya in 2015 at Rashtrapati Bhawan
- Born: 25 February 1966 (age 60); Tinsukia, Assam, India
- Scientific career
- Fields: Machine Learning; Bioinformatics; Network Security
- Institutions: Tezpur University (1995 - present); Jorhat Engineering College (1992 - 1995 )

Dhruba K. Bhattacharyya (born 25 February 1966) is a senior member of IEEE and a professor in the department of Computer Science and Engineering in Tezpur University, Tezpur, Assam.

== Career ==
Bhattacharyya served as the Dean of School of engineering, Tezpur University from February 2013 to February 2016 and also as the Dean of Academic affairs from January 2016 to March 2021. He held the office of the Pro Vice Chancellor of Tezpur University from April, 2021 to September, 2022. Currently he is the vice-chancellor (in-charge) of Tezpur University.

== Authorship ==
- Network Anomaly Detection: A Machine Learning Perspective, with Jugal K Kalita, 2013, CRC Press
- DDOS Attacks: Evolution, Detection, Prevention, Reaction and Tolerance, with Jugal K Kalita, 2016, CRC Press
- Network Traffic Anomaly Detection and Prevention: Concepts, Techniques, and Tools, with Monowar H. Bhuyan and Jugal K Kalita, 2017, Springer Nature
- Gene Expression Data Analysis: A Statistical and Machine Learning Perspective", with Pankaj Barah and Jugal K Kalita, 2021, CRC Press
