= James Lansford =

American electrical engineer

- Born: James L. Lansford; Huntland, Tennessee, U.S.
- Education: Auburn University; Georgia Institute of Technology; Oklahoma State University
- Occupation: Electrical engineer

James L. Lansford is an American electrical engineer.

== Life and career ==
Lansford was born in Huntland, Tennessee. He worked for the National Security Agency in Fort Meade, Maryland from 1976 to 1980, and attended Auburn University, earning his bachelor's degree in electrical engineering in 1980. He also attended the Georgia Institute of Technology, earning his master's degree in 1982, and earned his PhD degree at Oklahoma State University. After earning his degrees, from 1990 to 1994, he served as an assistant professor in the department of electrical and computer engineering at the University of Colorado Colorado Springs, and from 1996 to 2000, he worked as a wireless system architect at Intel.

From 2010 to 2015, Lansford served as a fellow of global standards at Qualcomm's CSR in Cambridge, and from 2015 to 2023, he served as director of Qualcomm in San Diego, California. In 2025, he served as senior director of technical standards at DeepSig Inc, and in 2026, he was named a fellow of the Institute of Electrical and Electronics Engineers, "for leadership in wireless standards and wireless coexistence".
