= Tuberculosis treatment in Colorado Springs =

The town of Colorado Springs, Colorado, played an important role in the history of tuberculosis in the era before antituberculosis drugs and vaccines. Tuberculosis management before this era was difficult and often of limited effect. In the 19th century, a movement for tuberculosis treatment in hospital-like facilities called sanatoriums became prominent, especially in Europe and North America. Thus people sought tuberculosis treatment in Colorado Springs because of its dry climate and fresh mountain air. Some people stayed in boarding houses, while others sought the hospital-like facilities of sanatoriums. (Note: The terms sanitarium and sanatorium are sometimes used interchangeably, but sanatorium is often reserved for hospital-like facilities that provide care for tuberculosis and other chronic diseases, whereas sanitarium is often reserved for destination spa-type facilities where someone stressed but not especially ill might go to recover their health.) In the 1880s and 1890s, it is estimated that one-third of the people living in Colorado Springs had tuberculosis. The number of sanatoriums and hospitals increased into the twentieth century. During World War II, medicines were developed that successfully treated tuberculosis and by the late 1940s specialized tuberculosis treatment facilities were no longer needed.

Several of the facilities evolved into hospitals or medical facilities: Glockner Tuberculosis Sanatorium evolved into Penrose Hospital. Beth-El Hospital, with the National Deaconess Sanitarium, evolved into Memorial Hospital. St. Francis Hospital was a hospital that had a sanatorium in its three building complex. Union Printers Home and the Modern Woodmen Tuberculosis Sanatorium, now Mount Saint Francis, are going concerns with skilled nursing care. Today, however, the structure's usages are different. Miramont Castle, which was the site of the Montcalm Sanitarium, is now a museum. National Methodist Sanatorium evolved into a building for the Ent Air Force Base and its site is now part of the United States Olympic Training Center.

== Background ==
People also came to Colorado for the restorative benefits of its "clean air and sunshine." Starting in the 1860s, when tuberculosis (TB) was a worldwide problem, physicians in the eastern United States recommended that their patients go to Colorado to regain their health. As a result, the number of people with tuberculosis, called "lungers", in the state grew substantially and without the services or facilities to support their needs. Tuberculosis was called consumption "because its symptoms consumed those who had it."

In Denver, not knowing how to manage a population of homeless, ill people, many were taken to jail. In 1878 in Colorado Springs, 25 or more of 73 who were buried at Mount Washington Cemetery had tuberculosis. Of the people that died in the city most of them had come to Colorado Springs so ill that it was not surprising that they died. Because of the number of people with TB flocking to Denver, by the 1880s it was nicknamed the "World's Sanitarium". On March 5, 1888, Dr. Frederick I. Knight, a specialist in lung diseases, spoke before the Boston Society of Medical Observation on the benefits of high altitude and the mountain climate of Colorado for patients with tuberculosis, including patients that experienced hemorrhaging. In the 1880s and 1890s more than a third of the city's residents came to Colorado Springs to improve their health. Houses on the Old North End had large sleeping porches for consumptive boarders. Large houses along North Nevada Avenue were turned into boarding houses for people with tuberculosis. Some stayed in tents and backyard cottages. The area became known as "lungers' row". Some of the famous individuals who came to the area to treat their tuberculosis include novelist Helen Hunt Jackson, railroad executive James J. Hagerman, author Marshall Sprague, and noted potter Artus Van Briggle.

Cynthia Stout, a history scholar, asserted that by 1900 "one-third of Colorado's population were residents of the state because of tuberculosis." In 1905, Dr. B.P. Anderson recommended open-air treatment in dry climates, like Colorado, Arizona, and New Mexico. The sanatoriums in Colorado Springs adopted a European tuberculosis treatment approach, including rest, open-air, and "disciplined gluttony". People ate twice as much as they would normally eat and might gain up to 50 pounds while in treatment. The Shoshone Spring, one of Manitou Mineral Springs, was taken for its laxative effects and the springs in general for their healing effects. The quality of care depended upon one's ability to pay. The poor might stay in open-air tents, some sanatoriums cost $7 per week, and the luxury accommodations were $50 per week. Sanatoriums claimed that about 60% of their patients were cured from their treatment. But the treatment patients received made the illness regress, it did not cure tuberculosis.

Charles H. Boissevain, a mathematically trained biochemist and professor of biology at Colorado College, was in 1924 appointed the first chief of research and laboratory director of the newly founded Colorado Foundation for Research in Tuberculosis, later renamed the Webb-Waring Institute. In 1940, four sanatoria remained: Cragmor, Glockner, National Methodist, St. Francis, Sunnyrest, and Modern Woodmen Sanatorium. During World War II, the drug Isoniazid (INH) began to be used to effectively treat tuberculosis. Then, sanatoriums began to close and the city shifted from a medical destination to one that developed a military presence.

== Locations ==
=== Battle Creek Sanitarium ===
The Battle Creek Sanitarium at 230 North Cascade Avenue was a branch of the Michigan facility that had been at 320 N. Tejon in 1903 and at that time was managed by Frank W. Patterson and K. E. McMillen. Lillian Voorhees was the nurse.

=== Cascade Villas ===
Cascade Villas was a short-lived home for the treatment of tuberculosis founded in 1874 by Dr. Thomas G. Horn. It was on Colorado Spring's North Cascade Avenue. Horn became the president of the Colorado State Medical Society in 1877.

=== Colorado Springs Sanitarium ===
There was a Colorado Springs Sanitarium and Hotel in the city in 1892. In 1903, the Colorado Springs Sanitarium and the Horn's Mineral Springs and Sanitarium were located at 1210 Lincoln Avenue and run by Dr. Thomas G. Horn. Colorado Springs Sanitarium was located downtown in a mansion one block from Acacia and Monument Valley Parks and the Carnegie Library in 1905. It was well-appointed, three-story building with modern heating and lighting and wide verandas for fresh-air. The building was originally built as a residence by a wealth contractor. Dr. Charles R. Knox was the superintendent of the facility at 126 North Cascade in 1907, one that's principles were in keeping with the Battle Creek Sanitarium. In 1909, the business manager was W. F. Patterson. (Note: According to Blevins and other authors, it did not appear that the facility was ever a going concern.) It operated in 1912, but by 1916 was the site of the Hallett and Baker Undertaking Company.

=== Cragmor Sanatorium ===
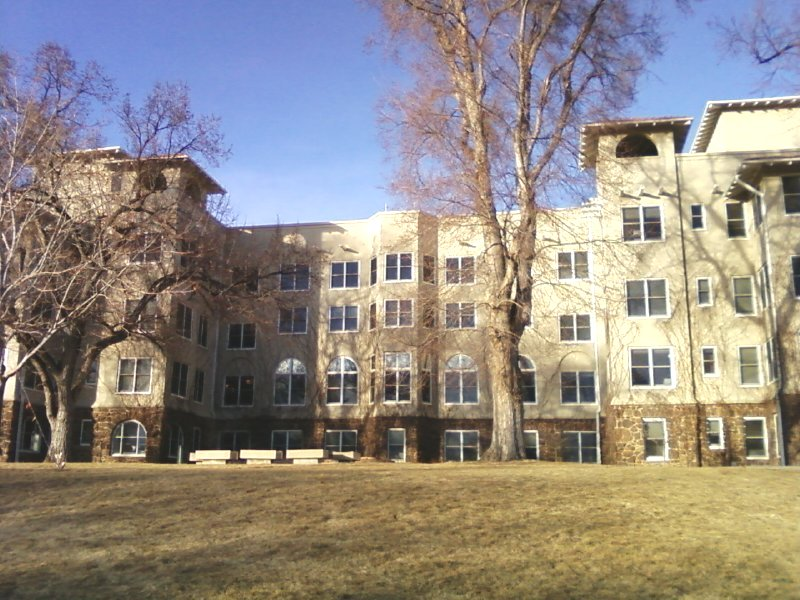
The Cragmor Sanatorium is now a building on the University of Colorado Colorado Springs campus.

The Cragmor Sanatorium was founded by leading tuberculosis specialist Dr. Edwin S. Solly in 1906. It was built in the Austin Bluffs, or Cragmor area. General William Jackson Palmer donated funds toward the construction of the facility for 25 patients. It treated tuberculosis and related diseases. He died shortly after it was built and in 1910 a group of local residents bought the sanatorium. Alexius L. Forster as the Physician-in-Charge and Mary L Whitney RN was the Superintendent in 1916.

Dr. Frank M. Houck, a House Manager at Cragmor, came to Colorado Springs in 1915 to treat his tuberculosis after receiving his medical degree from Johns Hopkins University. He built a 3.5 miles (5.6 km) trail from Cragmor through Austin Bluffs that was called the "Happy Walk". (Note: Dr. Houck bought 1,000 acres in Colorado Springs beginning in 1917 and in 2007 Dr. Frank M. Houck Park was named for him and dedicated. It is in the University Park neighborhood at Rockhurst Boulevard and Collegiate Drive.) Cragmor was a place where millionaires, musicians, artists, dancers, and poets came to get well and was known for its luxury, easy rules, parties, and sexual affairs among patients. In 1936, the $500,000 facility was reorganized as a non-profit organization for treatment and research of tuberculosis. The Cragmor Sanatorium complex became the University of Colorado Colorado Springs (UCCS) campus and two of its former buildings are Cragmor and Main halls.

=== Glockner Tuberculosis Sanatorium ===
As a memorial to her husband, Albert Glockner, the 22-year-old widow Marie Gwynne Glockner opened the Glockner Tuberculosis Sanatorium in 1890. Her husband had died of tuberculosis at 31 years of age. Glockner family members supported the development of the sanatorium. Patients were charged $1 (equivalent to $36 in 2025) per day. The first superintendent was Dr. Boswell P. Anderson, who was a former Colorado Midland Railway physician. His assistant was Dr. Charles Fox Gardiner and the matron and head nurse was Sarah Callahan, RN. It was located at 2200 N. Tejon in the North End addition.

In 1893, Marie Gwynne Glockner gave the sanatorium to the Sisters of Charity of Cincinnati, who were brought in for their care-giving and professional skills. In 1903, the manager was Sister Xavier Magevney. The Glockner Sanatorium and Training School for Nurses was operated by Sister Rose Alexius, the superioress, in 1916. It had 200 beds by 1921 and was the Glockner Sanatorium and Hospital in 1940.

Glockner evolved over the years into Penrose Hospital. Penrose Hospital won an Excellence in Historic Preservation Stewardship award in 2014 for the fully restored tuberculosis hut, or tent cottage, and its early 20th century furnishings that was used by people who came to the Colorado Springs area to cure their tuberculosis. The hut is located at the corner of Jackson Street and Cascade Avenue.

=== Idlewold ===
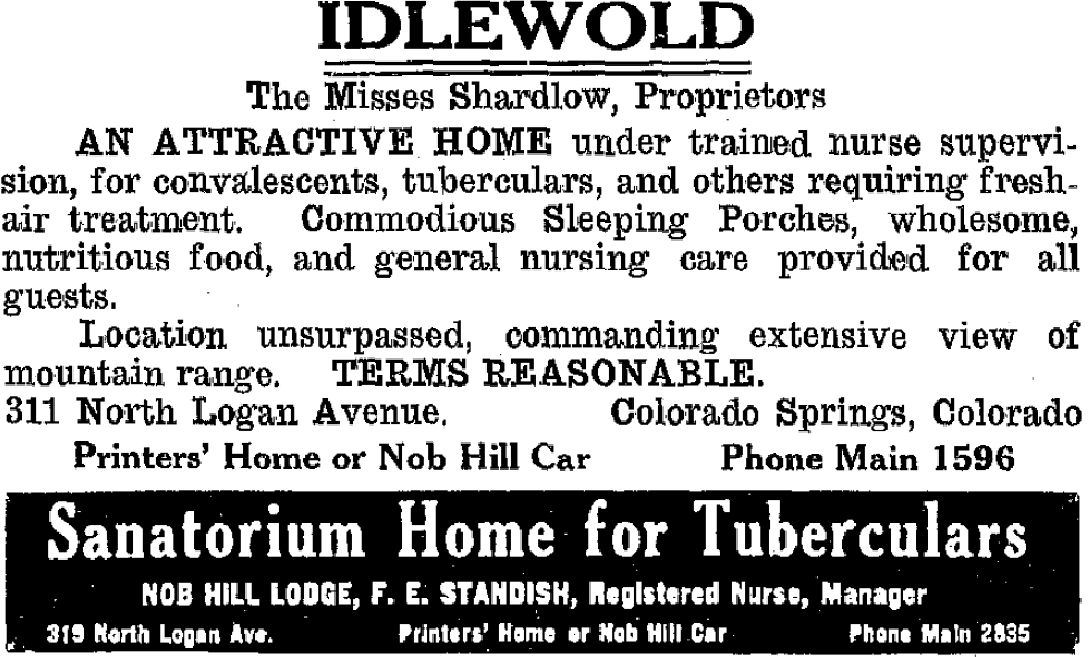
Idlewold and Nob Hill Lodge advertisements in 1916

The Idlewold, also spelled Idlewild, was located at 311 North Logan. It was established in 1912 and the superintendent was Lois Shardlow, RN. Her sister, also a nurse, assisted in the management of the home. The facility had 10 rooms, all with sleeping porches, and treated patients with tuberculosis. It is now a Ronald McDonald House.

=== Montcalm Sanitarium (Manitou Springs) ===
Miramont Castle was built between 1895 and 1897 by Father Francolon, based upon architectural design elements that he picked up in his travels and ideas from his father, a diplomat. He hired brothers Archie and Angus Gillis to design the building, and was involved in the detailed planning meetings. The green sandstone used in the construction of the castle's walls was quarried nearby. It had electricity and indoor plumbing. Father Francolon invited the Sisters of Mercy to use his home for a tuberculosis treatment facility. Their first patient arrived in August 1895 and the next year they built the sanitarium. The offered good food, clean lodging, and care to patients who were not very seriously ill and by 1896 taught music lessons. From 1900 to 1904, Miramont was vacant. That sanitarium was burned down due to an electrical fire in 1907 and patients moved into the Miramont Castle building. It used about a dozen open-air TB huts until about 1923. One of the huts was donated to the museum in 1998 is located on the museum grounds. Between 1928 and 1946, the castle was used by the Sisters as a luxury boarding house, a retreat for clergy, and stood vacant. It is now a museum owned by the Manitou Springs Historical Society.

=== National Deaconess Sanitarium ===
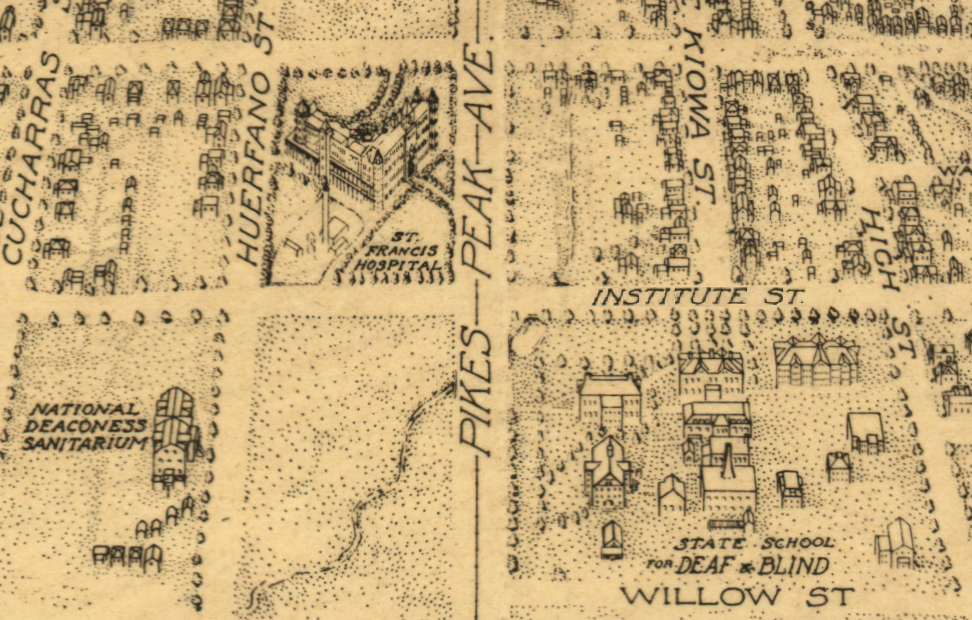
The National Deaconess Sanitarium building (built as the 1890 Bellevue Sanitarium) was near the Colorado School for the Deaf and Blind (1874) and the St. Francis Hospital (1887).

The Eleanor Home, run by Eleanor Collier and about 30 women, administered care beginning in 1888 to patients with tuberculosis while the Bellevue Sanitarium was built. The Bellevue Sanitarium opened in 1890 on Institute Street near St. Francis Hospital with five tents. It was founded by a group of physicians and the house physician was Dr. S. Edwin Solly. The matron was Mary E. Dean, RN. In 1900, it became the National Deaconess Sanitarium, sponsored by the Methodist Church. It evolved into the Beth-El Hospital in 1911 and ultimately Memorial Hospital in 1943.

=== National Methodist Sanatorium ===
The National Methodist Sanatorium was a 1926 building on a 29-acre (12 ha) tract east of the "Nurse's Home" of the Beth-El General Hospital's medical complex. The City of Colorado Springs bought the Beth-El complex, Sanatorium, its Nutrition Camp, and other buildings in 1943. The Beth-El Hospital became Memorial Hospital. The Sanatorium became the Ent Air Force Base, which was the Air Defense Command and later North American Aerospace Defense Command (NORAD) headquarters. The property and site of the former sanatorium are now the United States Olympic Training Center.

=== Knob Hill Lodge Sanatorium ===
The Knob Hill Lodge Sanatorium at 319 North Logan was a sanatorium operated by the proprietor and manager, the registered nurse Florence E Standish. Founded in 1912, it treated tuberculosis and had 35 beds.

=== Nordrach Ranch Sanitarium ===
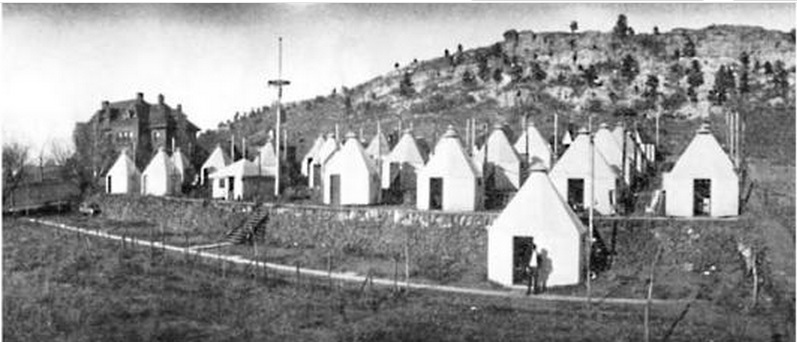
Nordach Sanatorium, Austin Bluffs, Colorado, in 1906

The Nordrach Ranch Sanitarium was Colorado's first open-air sanatorium in which patients stayed in tents on the grounds of the facility. It operated from 1901 to 1903. Nordrach was founded by Dr. Charles Fox Gardiner. It was 1.5 miles (2.4 km) northeast of city limits at Austin Bluffs. Dr. E. J. White was president, W. B. Price was vice-president, and M. E. Harper was secretary.

=== Red Crags Sanatorium (Manitou Springs) ===
Red Crags Manor was built by Dr. William Bell, a founding father of Manitou Springs. It was made into a sanatorium. It was located one mile east of Manitou Springs. In 1916, the sanatorium was owned and operated by Mrs. Lilia P. Sawin, a nurse. The building is now a bed and breakfast.

=== St. Francis Sanatorium ===
The Colorado Midland Railway clinic or St. Francis Hospital, built in 1887, was the city's first hospital. It was located at Pikes Peak Avenue and Prospect Street and among other health issues, it treated tuberculosis. Sisters from the St. Francis of Perpetual Adoration of Lafayette, Indiana, came to Colorado Springs to provide medical aid to the new city. The women were Sisters Mary Huberta Duennebacke, Mary Silveria, Mary Notberga, and Mary Kunigunda Neuhoff. Sister Huberta was the administrator of the hospital from 1887 to 1890, when she went to Denver to build the St. Anthony Hospital, which opened in 1893. (Note: The Sisters from the St. Francis of Perpetual Adoration had been providing medical care railroad workers in Denver since 1884. The Sisters also founded St Anthony North, Westminster in 1971.)

They treated patients at the first small building, which was a clinic for the Colorado Midland Railway, and shortly after their arrival received an influx of patients due to a train accident that injured 60 people and killed several people. Realizing the need for a bigger hospital, Sisters Notberga and Huberta went door-to-door throughout El Paso County asking for donations to build a larger hospital. In October 1887, the Sisters purchased the land and had a larger hospital built for $20,000 (equivalent to $716,667 in 2025) at Pikes Peak Avenue and Institute Street in early 1888. Patients from the Colorado Midland Railway clinic were transferred to the new St. Francis Hospital. It administered care to employees of the Chicago and Rock Island Railroad and the Atchison, Topeka and Santa Fe Railway and provided medical services to the greater public. Physicians and the Sisters treated a wide range of illness and injuries. The sisters carried on their duties at the hospital and performed fund-raising to support the hospital and programs to provide food for the hungry. Sister Mary Hermana Meschede was the superior from 1890 to 1893.

St. Francis Hospital grew to have three connected buildings. One of the buildings, the 29 building, was built in 1929 as a sanatorium for tuberculosis patients. It had private rooms with sun porches to provide fresh air and sunlight. A crematorium was located near the Colorado School for the Deaf and Blind for the dead bodies of people who died of tuberculosis. The hospital complex was renamed St. Francis Health Center when it merged with Penrose Hospital in 1989. The hospital treated trauma patients until 1994 and mentally ill patients until 2010.

=== Star Ranch Sanatorium ===
The Star Ranch in the Pines Sanatorium was founded in 1903. H. C. Goodson was the medical director of the 50-bed tuberculosis treatment facility.

=== Sunnyrest Sanitarium ===
Sunnyrest Sanitarium Sunnyrest was a sanitarium for men, women, and children run by five Sisters of the Kaiserwerth Deaconesses. Sister Ida Tobschall was the superintendent and there were three nurses and a cook. It was opened in 1910 and had handled 77 patients in three years, many who came to them through Associated Charities. It was a home-like setting with a living room with a fireplace, dining room, and two outdoor porches for men and women. Patients that could contribute paid $8 per week for their care. Most of the money came from donations from the community. It was located at 926 E Boulder, and near the Beth-El Hospital. Sunnyrest had 45 beds in 1921.

=== Union Printers Home ===
The Union Printers Home was a facility for rest and respite for the members of the International Typographical Union (ITU). The ITU established the facility in 1892, and maintained the property until the union's merger with the Communications Workers of America (CWA) in 1986. The idea of a facility that could care for the union's "aged and infirm" members - especially those with tuberculosis that spread in the cramped working conditions of printing shops and those with a specific type of black lung that came from inhaling the fumes of carbon-based ink used in the printing process.

In 1886, Philadelphia philanthropists and business partners, George W. Childs and Anthony J Drexel, donated a total{{efn|Or, Childs and Drexel each donated $5,000 towards the construction of a Union Printers Home. of $10,000 (equivalent to $358,333 in 2025) to the Union “without condition or suggestion of any kind, as an absolute gift, in full confidence that the sagacious and conservative counselors of your union will make or order wise use of it for the good of the union.” This donation began the Childs-Drexel Fund, which eventually became the initial money that led to the establishment of the Childs-Drexel Home for Union Printers (later renamed the Union Printers Home). The City of Colorado Springs deeded 80 acres to the ITU to build the home, which cost $71,144 (equivalent to $2,549,327 in 2025) to build. It was dedicated on May 12, 1892.

Over the next few decades, the Home grew to approximately 300 acres, with numerous buildings for resident care, one of the largest dairy farms in the state, and various other agricultural ventures.

With the decline of the printing trade in the 1960s and '70s, the ITU began to sell off portions of the property in order to stay afloat. In 1986, they merged with the Communications Workers of America. The CWA operated the property until 2014, when it was sold to Heart Living Centers, a Kansas-based private nursing care organization, which was open to the general public and offered long-term skilled nursing and assisted living for seniors and disabled veterans, as well as hospice care. The Union Printers Home was closed as a care facility in February 2020. It was purchased in June 2021 by a group of local, civic-minded Colorado Springs families to be reimagined into something new.

=== Woodmen Sanatorium ===
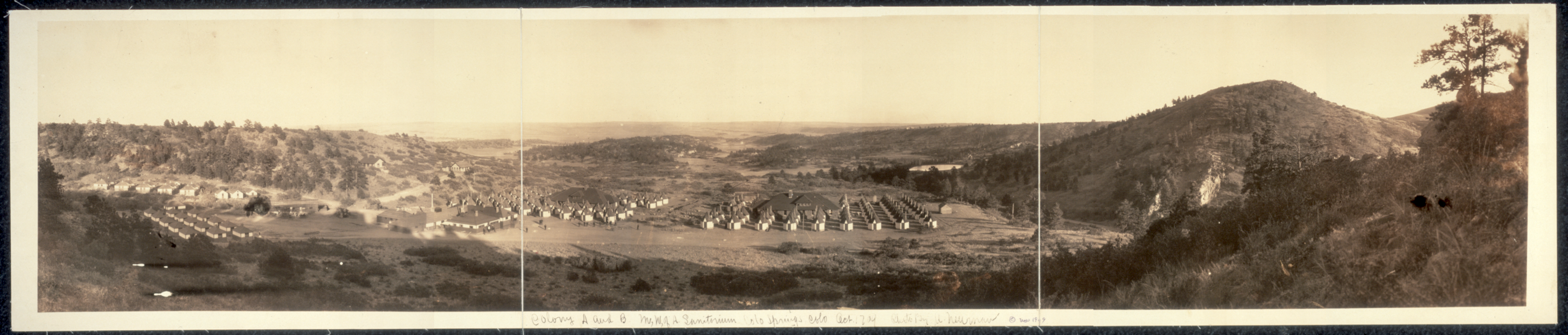
Modern Woodmen Sanitorium in Colorado Springs (1909)

The Modern Woodmen of America Sanatorium was a facility of the Modern Woodmen of America north of the city for the treatment of tuberculosis that operated from 1909 to 1947. The Sanatorium had 80 patients in 1909, but the organization estimated that 10,000 of its 1 million members had tuberculosis. According to Head Consul A. R. Talbot, it intended to expand the facility within 10 years to meet the needs of all of its members. At its peak, the open-air facility accommodated 180 people. It was open-air throughout all seasons and patients might find themselves in snow. Its members received treatment free of charge. Between 1909 and 1947, the facility cared for 12,000 patients. It was the Pikes Peak region's largest sanatorium. The 1400-acre complex had a main building, administration building, auditorium, 24 homes, and a heating plant. Two reservoirs, fed by three mountain streams, supplied water for the Sanatorium and it had a dairy farm. Eighty employees were required to maintain the facility, but in 1947 there were only 18 patients and the sanatorium was sold. When the facility closed, 205 huts were sold and became tool sheds and toy houses.

The property was purchased by Blevins Davis in July 1950. His wife, Marguerite Davis, a railroad heiress, died in 1948 and wished to have her fortune used for charitable purposes. The Modern Woodmen Sanatorium property and a house in Broadmoor called Trianon were sold to the Poor Sisters of St. Francis (Sisters of St. Francis of Perpetual Adoration) for $1 in 1952. The combined fortune that they received was worth $2,325,000 (equivalent to $27,874,071 in 2025). The Catholic order of nuns ran the St. Francis Hospital in Colorado Springs and others in Nebraska, New Mexico, Colorado, and Kansas.

In 1954, the Sisters of St. Francis of Perpetual Adoration moved from Denver to Colorado Springs and have operated educational facilities and programs, mentoring programs, and Mount Saint Francis skilled nursing facilities on what is now a 110-acre property.

Woodmen Road, a major east–west arterial starts near the original sanatorium and runs for 15 miles through the northern suburbs of Colorado Springs. It is named both for the sanatorium and the Modern Woodmen of America.

=== Other ===
Reverend William R. Stephens from the People's Methodist Episcopal Church of Colorado Springs was a trustee for a sanatorium in Calhan. James K. Polk Taylor, a former slave, and his freeborn wife Elizabeth James Taylor, 71 and 75 years old respectively, donated 480 acres of rich farming land in Calhan for a sanatorium in 1910. They had worked the land for fourteen years and wished to have a tuberculosis sanatorium built for African Americans and other races. Their land, valued at about $4,800 (equivalent to $165,857 in 2025), was donated to the Charles Sumner National Tuberculosis Association. The Taylors were to live on the farm in a cottage built by the association. The advisory committee for the association included W. E. B. Du Bois.

The free clinic for people with tuberculosis was opened in two offices of the Visiting Nurses Association in 1919. It was located at 302 South Wahsatch Avenue and was run by Dr. Mary Riggs Noble. It was open under the auspices of the recently formed local branch of the Colorado Public Health Association.
