= Cragmor, Colorado =

Cragmor
- Area
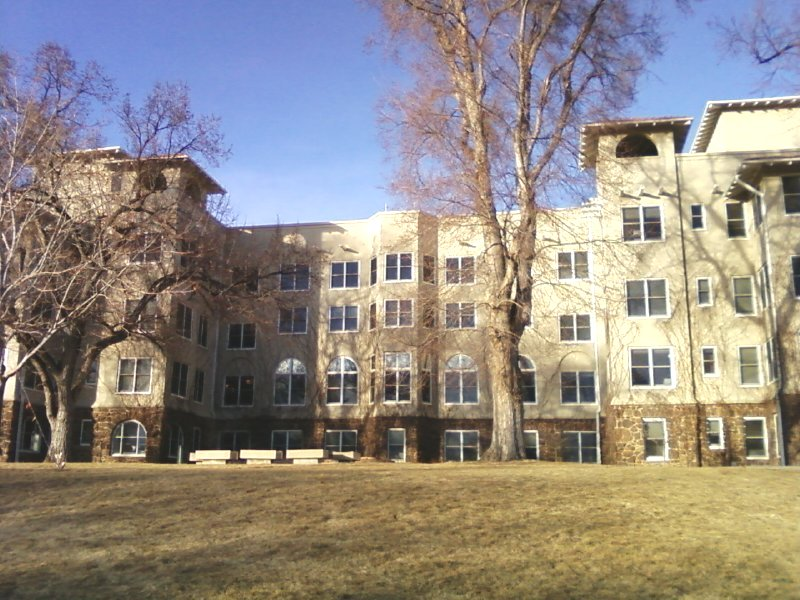
- Former main Cragmor Sanatorium building, now the Main Hall of University of Colorado Colorado Springs
- Etymology: Cragmor Sanitorium
- Location within the United States Location within Colorado
- Coordinates: 38°53′16.19″N 104°48′7.95″W
- Country: United States
- State: Colorado
- Municipality: Colorado Springs
- Time zone: UTC−7 (MST)
  - Summer (DST): UTC−6 (MDT)
- Zip code: 80907 (south), 80918 (north)
- Area code: 719
- Website: Cragmor Neighborhood Association

Cragmor, first known as Cragmoor, is an area in central Colorado Springs, Colorado, between Templeton Gap and Austin Bluffs. A coal mining site during the 19th century, the area became known as the Cragmor around the turn of the century because the Cragmor Sanatorium was located there. By the 1950s, the mines were abandoned and the land was developed for housing. Cragmor was annexed to the City of Colorado Springs in the early 1960s. The Cragmor Sanatorium became the main hall for the University of Colorado Colorado Springs campus.

== History and geography ==
=== Mining ===
External images
- Inactive Coal Mine Data and Subsidence Information for El Paso County (map)
- Colorado Springs Central / Cragmor mines (map)

Before the area was named Cragmor, beginning about 1859, the area was mined for coal. There were 50 coal mines in Colorado Springs. The Cragmor mines were the City Mine, the Altitude, Williamsville Mine, Curtis Mine, Patterson Mine, the Climax mines, the Conley, Busy Bee, and the Danville. Coal was mined using the "room and pillar" method, in which areas of unmined coal acted as pillars while coal was removed from the shafts, creating rooms. Sometimes, rather than leaving the pillar for support, the supporting coal was removed. Coal was mined from fields from one to fourteen feet deep.

Of the city's 50 abandoned mines, 22 have become hazardous because they were "very shallow mines"—some no more than 30 feet (9.1 m) below the surface—that are now subject to sinking under developed land. For instance, the ground gives way after wood that held up the roof of the rooms deteriorates, generally 10 to 20 years after the mines closed. There are also hazards due to mine openings, drainage of metals or other pollutants from the mines, or fires within mines or the outside waste banks. Many of the hazardous, abandoned mines are near Cragmor, such as Cragmor Country Club Estates that had about 3,000 residents in the late 1980s. There were more than 2,400 crack and sinkholes in the Cragmor Country Club Estates area, while there were only a total of seven in other areas of Colorado Springs during a 1985 study supervised by the Colorado Mined Land Reclamation Division.

=== Cragmor Sanatorium ===
The area was named by Edwin Solly, who began plans to build the 100-acre Cragmor Sanatorium in 1902, when William Jackson Palmer donated funds to build a sanatorium. The Cragmor Sanatorium opened in 1905. Located between the bluffs of Palmer Park and Austin Bluffs, he named it for the moors and crags of Great Britain, which described "where high bluffs join the low plains". Cragmor is located about 300 feet (91 m) in elevation above and 3 miles (4.8 km) northeast of downtown Colorado Springs. Located on a bluff of prairie grass, pines, and ground oaks, the sanatorium's westward view included Pikes Peak and Rampart Range.

In the following decades it developed a following among the cultural elite and many of its patients were wealthy. However, they were hit hard by the Great Depression in the 1930s and Cragmor suffered from financial distress into the 1940s. It was briefly reinvigorated in the 1950s when a contract with the Bureau of Indian Affairs established Cragmor as a treatment center for Navajo people with tuberculosis. About ten years later, the Navajo patients were transferred elsewhere.

=== Residential development ===
External images
- An original cottage, Cragmor, Pikes Peak Library District
- Aerial view of Cragmor Sanatorium campus (with Palmer Park and the plains of what is now greater Colorado Springs in the background), Pikes Peak Library District
- Aerial view of Cragmor Sanatorium campus (with Palmer Park in the background, following more development), Pikes Peak Library District

Bungalows were built for patients and physicians of the Cragmor Sanatorium in an area named Cragmor Village. It was listed on the National Register of Historic Places by 2013 for its historical significance during the sanatoria era and because it is threatened by plans for expansion of the University of Colorado Colorado Springs (UCCS) campus.

By the 1950s, coal was no longer mined in the area, and land was developed for the construction of about 3,500 houses, which was completed in the early 1960s. Then, the initial instances of subsidence began, such as one on Mount View Lane in 1963. In another case, a dog died when the earth sunk in the backyard and the resulting falling dirt suffocated the animal. In 1979, earth sunk into an old mine shaft by a fourplex on Magnolia Street in the Cragmor area. The residents had to evacuate, and the building braced.

=== Annexation ===
The City of Colorado Springs began to annex sections of the area in 1953, when Cragmor Heights and Cragmor Hills were incorporated into Colorado Springs. Four thousand acres were annexed to Colorado Springs on December 23, 1969. The following year, Cragmor area residents took the city to court for several reasons, including preference for services offered by the North Suburban district over that of the City of Colorado Springs. Following a Colorado Supreme Court decision in 1972, the annexation was upheld, supporting the 1970 decision of the El Paso District Court. In 2015, Lookout at Cragmor was also annexed.

=== University of Colorado Colorado Springs ===
As early as the 1945, University of Colorado offered classes in the Colorado Springs area at various locations, mostly Colorado College. By the 1960s, however, a permanent campus was desired. George Dwire, the Executive Director of the Cragmor Sanatorium, sold the sanatorium property for $1 to the state, which became the property of the University of Colorado in 1964. In 1965, UCCS moved to its current location on Austin Bluffs Parkway in the Cragmor neighborhood of northern Colorado Springs. The campus is located at one of the highest parts of the city.

Because of its ties to Hewlett-Packard, initial university programs focused on engineering and business, and classes were held in the Cragmor Sanatorium building, what is now Main Hall, and Cragmor Hall, a modern expansion of Main Hall. The first building built exclusively for the University of Colorado Colorado Springs (UCCS), Dwire Hall, was completed in 1972. A 1997 community referendum merged Beth-El College of Nursing with UCCS. In recent years, programs such as the Network Information and Space Security Center were added to connect the university with the military to improve national security. Other programs, including the CU Institute for Bioenergetics and the Institute for Science and Space Studies, cast an eye toward the future. In 2001, UCCS purchased an 87,000-square-foot (8,100 m^{2}) building at the corner of Union and Austin Bluffs to house the Beth-El College of Nursing.

The former Katherine Bates Elementary School at 702 Cragmor Road was razed to create dormitory housing for the campus, which was completed in fall 2017. There is also a five-story housing project, The Lookout on Cragmor at 10 Cragmor Village Road, completed fall 2019.

== Neighborhoods ==
In what is now Central Colorado Springs, the Cragmor neighborhood is located by the UCCS campus. Cragmor is divided in two areas by Austin Bluffs. The South Cragmor neighborhood is located south of the UCCS campus, between Austin Bluffs Parkway and Templeton Gap. The North Cragmor neighborhood is located north of Cragmor Village Road, and between the UCCS campus and Union Boulevard.

== Parks and sports complex ==
Within the South Cragmor neighborhood are Danville Park, Portal Park, and Grace Center for Athletics. Danville Park is a 5.3-acre park located at 1147 Mountview Lane at North Hancock Avenue. It has fields for baseball and soccer, a basketball court, a playground, and picnic area. Portal Park, a 10.6-acre park located at 3535 North Hancock Avenue, has an outdoor swimming pool, baseball and soccer fields, multi-play court, tennis courts, and trails. The swimming pool was built in 1974 and 1975. In 1979, subsidence resulted in a 12 by 7 feet (3.7 by 2.1 m) sinkhole in the park. It was discovered that 31 feet (9.4 m) below the surface of the park were mine shafts and the pool was slipping into one of them. The sinkhole was filled and the pool braced when tons of concrete was poured into the shafts.

Grace Center for Athletics is a 25-acre sports complex of St. Mary's High School for baseball, soccer, football, track and field, field hockey, lacrosse. It is used by the school and by non-profit organizations for children of Southern Colorado.
