= Jugal Kalita =

Professor of Computer Science at the University of Colorado Springs

- Born: 1960 (age 65–66); Nagaon, Assam, India
- Education: Indian Institute of Technology, Kharagpur (B.Tech., 1982); University of Saskatchewan(M.Sc., 1984); University of Pennsylvania(M.S., 1988; Ph.D., 1990)
- Scientific career
- Fields: Computer Science, Computational Linguistics, Natural Language Processing
- Workplaces: University of Colorado, Colorado Springs (1990 - present); Tezpur University, Assam, India (Adjunct Professor)(2019 - )
- Doctoral advisor: Norman Badler
- Website: cs.uccs.edu/~jkalita/

Jugal Kalita is a Chair professor of computer science at the College of Engineering and Applied Science within the University of Colorado, Colorado Springs (UCCS).

== Academics ==
Jugal Kalita completed his school from Ramakrishna Mission Vidyapith, Deoghar in present-day Jharkhand, India. Jugal Kalita is founder of the Language Information and Computation (LINC) Lab at the University of Colorado Colorado Springs (UCCS).

== Authorship ==
- On Perl: Perl for Students and Professionals, 2003, Universal Publishers
- Network Anomaly Detection: A Machine Learning Perspective, with Dhruba K. Bhattacharyya, 2013, CRC Press
- DDOS Attacks: Evolution, Detection, Prevention, Reaction and Tolerance, with Dhruba K. Bhattacharyya, 2016, CRC Press
- Network Traffic Anomaly Detection and Prevention: Concepts, Techniques, and Tools, with Monowar H. Bhuyan and Dhruba K. Bhattacharyya, 2017, Springer Nature
- Gene Expression Data Analysis: A Statistical and Machine Learning Perspective, with Pankaj Barah and Dhruba Kumar Bhattacharyya, 2021, CRC Press
- Machine Learning: Theory and Practice, CRC Press, 2023 CRC Press
- Data Mining: Theory and Practice, First Edition, with Dhruba K. Bhattacharyya and Swarup Roy, Elsevier, 2023 Elsevier
