= Penrose Hospital =

- CommonSpirit Health
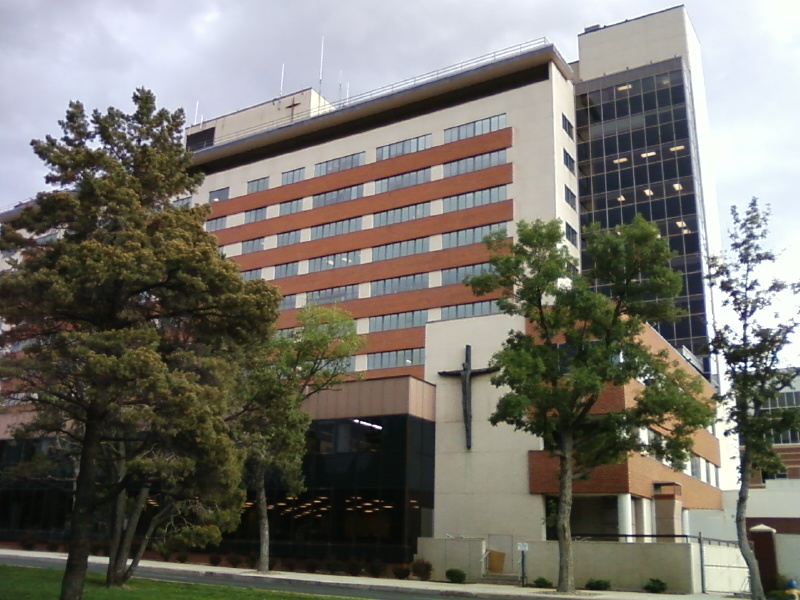

Geography
- Location: 2222 N. Nevada Avenue, Colorado Springs, Colorado, United States
- Coordinates: 38°51′56″N 104°49′18″W

Organization
- Type: General

Services
- Emergency department: Level II trauma center
- Beds: 364

History
- Founded: 1890

Links
- Lists: Hospitals in Colorado

Penrose Hospital is a 364-bed hospital located in Colorado Springs, Colorado and owned by Penrose-Saint Francis Health Services. The campus includes Penrose Hospital, the Penrose Cancer Center, the E Tower building, the Penrose Pavilion, and the John Zay House. The hospital is a Level II trauma center.

Founded in 1890 as the Glockner Tuberculosis Sanatorium, it became the Penrose Tumor Institute (now the Penrose Cancer Center) in 1939. In 1959, it became Penrose Hospital. It provides medical and surgical services, and specializes in the treatment of cardiac conditions and cancer. It offers emergency trauma care as well as physical rehabilitation.

== History ==
In 1890, the hospital was founded as Glockner Tuberculosis Sanatorium, by Marie Gynne Glockner after the death of her husband, Albert Glockner, from tuberculosis. The first superintendent of the hospital was Dr. B.P. Anderson, who founded St. Francis Hospital. The Sisters of Charity of Cincinnati, Ohio assumed ownership of the hospital in 1893. It had sanatoriums and hospitals in Pueblo, Colorado and Albuquerque, New Mexico.

During the first two decades of the 20th century the sanitarium became the Glockner Sanatorium and Hospital, a general acute care hospital, and performed lung removal and the first bronchoscopy west of St. Louis. In 1939, it was selected as the site of the Penrose Tumor Institute, later the Penrose Cancer Center. Spencer Penrose established the institute to treat people with cancer, like him, with the latest technology. The Penrose Cancer Center Pavilion was dedicated in 1941 by Spencer Penrose's widow, Julie Penrose. It became "one of the most famous hospitals in the United States" offering research, diagnosis and treatment, including radiation therapy, of cancer. A new nurses residence, Margery Reed building, was constructed from donations by Mrs. Verner Z. Reed, in memory of her daughter Margery Reed Mayo. It is now a medical office building. The name of the hospital was changed to Glockner-Penrose Hospital in 1947, at the suggestion of Marie Gynne Glockner. Julie Penrose donated $3.2 million for the construction of an addition to the hospital for more hospital beds. It was dedicated in 1959 and the hospital name was changed to Penrose Hospital. From 1947 to 1987 the hospital saw the addition of intensive care, outpatient care, emergency trauma and surgical facilities. There was also an addition of a new cancer center.

The Sisters of Charity of Cincinnati, Ohio and St. Francis of Colorado Springs organizations were consolidated and in 1990 became the Penrose-St. Francis Health Services. In 1995, Centura Health, a nonprofit health system across Colorado, was formed by the Sisters of Charity Health Services Colorado and the Porter Care Adventist Health System. In 2023, Centura's two components disaffiliated and became two separate health networks again, one called CommonSpirit and one called AdventHealth. As of August 1, 2023, Penrose Hospital is in the CommonSpriit health network.

== Hospital ==
=== Buildings ===
Penrose Hospital (2222 N. Nevada Avenue) has an inpatient Hospice and Palliative Care department, developed as the result of a partnership between the Penrose-St. Francis Health Services and Pikes Peak Hospice & Palliative Care (PPHPC). The hospital has a helipad (helicopter landing pad).

The hospital's five-story E Tower building contains a reception area, its critical care and cardiovascular units, administrative and medical offices, gift shop, pharmacy and an employee gym. (Note: The E Tower building is located on the site of the previous chapel, the old Sacred Heart Chapel.)

The Penrose Pavilion (2312 N. Nevada Avenue) is a four-story medical office building on the grounds of Penrose Hospital but is owned by Westfield Development Company. Occupants are the Colorado Springs Neurological Associates, the Penrose Hospital Woman's Diagnostic Center, and medical offices.

The John Zay House (corner of Tejon and Madison) provides lodging for the families of Penrose Hospital patients who are critically ill, as well as patients receiving treatment at the Penrose Cancer Center and their families. People that obtain treatment from the Penrose Cancer Center include people from other Colorado towns and Kansas. It is named for John Zay, who was the hospital chaplain for 14 years after surviving cancer. He died following an accident in 2004.

=== Departments and specialties ===
Within Penrose Hospital some of the specialty departments are:

- Bariatric Weight Loss Surgery
- Breast Care Center
- Cancer Center
- Critical Care
- Emergency / Trauma
- Hospice and Palliative Care
- Imaging / Radiology
- Surgical Services

=== Amenities ===
Penrose Hospital has the Penrose Place cafeteria, Penrose Cafe and Bistro, and the Penrose Pavilion Coffee Bar. Other amenities include an outpatient pharmacy, women's boutique, gift shop, and wireless internet access throughout the building. Penrose Hospital is a tobacco free campus.

A new chapel was opened at Penrose Hospital, utilizing stained glass from the previous old Sacred Heart Chapel on hospital grounds. Services may be viewed live from patients rooms or via taped recordings.

Webb Medical Library, on the hospital's basement floor, is open to medical staff, patients and the public. It has videos, books, journals and computers. It has a "wellness" room with games, videos and novelties to inspire laughter, which is known to reduce stress hormones, like adrenaline, and increase endorphines which help people feel better. Joseph Michelli, a staff psychologist at Penrose Hospital's Division of Behavior Medicine, uses laughter therapy to help patients with severe depression or help manage fears of cancer patients.

=== Parking ===
Penrose's surface parking and five-story garage provide space for 1,680 vehicles. Parking lots are on the east side of the hospital. Complimentary valet service is available at the Main Hospital Entrance from 5:30 am to 8 pm Monday thru Friday and closed on major holidays. The first floor of the parking garage off of Jackson Street has several spaces allocated for Radiation Therapy patients. There are several spaces on the second floor for patients of Dr. Young in Medical Oncology.

== Excellency Awards ==
In 2001, HealthGrades gave Penrose-St. Francis Health Services its Excellence Awards in women's health, joint replacement, pulmonary care, and critical care. It also named it as one of the top 50 U.S. hospitals - the only hospital in Colorado to receive the distinction.

In 2010, Penrose-St. Francis Health Services received 10 five-star ratings in HealthGrades "Hospital Quality in America" report. The five-star ratings included 3 for orthopedic care and 2 for pulmonary care. Due to complication rates, gall bladder removal and bariatric surgery received one-star rating. The rest of the procedures received three-star ratings.
