= Marshall Sprague =

American journalist and author (1909–1994)

- Marshall Sprague in April 1964
- Born: March 14, 1909; Newark, Ohio
- Died: September 9, 1994 (aged 85); Colorado Springs, Colorado
- Occupations: Journalist and writer
- Notable work: A Gallery of Dudes; Colorado, A Bicentennial History; Massacre: The Tragedy At White River; Money Mountain; Newport In The Rockies

Marshall Sprague (March 14, 1909 – September 9, 1994) was an American journalist in New York, Paris, and China and writer of books about western United States history. From Ohio, he moved to Colorado Springs, Colorado to recuperate following a diagnosis of tuberculosis and settled there. He received the Colorado Authors League Top Hand Award for Massacre: The Tragedy At White River and A Gallery of Dudes.

== Early life and career ==
Born March 14, 1909 in Newark, Ohio, he graduated from Lawrenceville School and Princeton University (1930), both in New Jersey. After Princeton, he first worked at Women’s Wear Daily. He was a journalist in Paris for the New York Herald-Tribune's Paris edition and China for North China Star . He then contributed to The New York Times, writing book reviews and articles for the Sunday Times.

He moved to the North End of Colorado Springs, Colorado following a diagnosis of tuberculosis in 1941. As he recovered, he wrote The Business of Getting Well.

He is the author of Money Mountain (1953) about Cripple Creek and Victor gold mining. In 1957, he received the Colorado Authors League Top Hand Award for Massacre: The Tragedy At White River of the Meeker Massacre of 1879. He wrote Newport In The Rockies: The Life And Good Times Of Colorado Springs (1961), which Cleveland Amory, a social historian, described as "candid, graceful, diligently researched". He also wrote A Gallery of Dudes (1967) described as a book of "wonderful tales about eminent commoners and titled Europeans awash in the exhilarating landscapes of America's last frontier" by a critic. It received the Top Hand Award in 1967. In 1976, his book Colorado, A Bicentennial History was published. Another of his books of western history was So Vast So Beautiful a Land: Louisiana and the Purchase about the Louisiana Purchase. His memoir, Sometimes I'm Happy, was published the year following his death, with the assistance of family and friends.

== Personal life ==
Married February 1939, his wife was Edna Jane (E.J.) (née Ailes) Sprague, an activist, serving civic commissions and boards and the Colorado Springs City Planning Commission. (Note: Born in West Virginia in 1911, Edna Jane attended Vassar. She died in late May 2006 in Albuquerque, New Mexico, after having lived in Colorado Springs for more than 60 years. She was the first woman to serve on the planning commission for the city and worked on historic preservation and establishing planning and zoning code. She sat on the city's park board, strongly supported the Colorado Springs Fine Arts Center over three decades, and helped established a multi-disciplinary approach and half-way house for treatment of injured people. E.J. starred in Colorado Springs Civic Players productions.) They had three children, Sharon, Stephen, and Joseph. He was a jazz piano player and bird watcher.

Sprague died in Colorado Springs at St. Francis Hospital at the age of 85 on September 9, 1994.

== Legacy ==
In 2014, Alex Johnson in the Colorado Springs Gazette wrote of Sprague's influence:

Marshall Sprague was an admired and prolific writer who wrote extensively on the Springs and Cripple Creek. His works are a must for anyone interested in beginning an investigation into local history. Other histories have been written on General William Jackson Palmer, Spencer Penrose, Winfield Scott Stratton and Helen Hunt Jackson, but biographical works often fail to explain the idiosyncrasies and the historical/political development of the city.

Marshall Sprague Park in Colorado Springs is named for him. Located at 3492 W. Woodmen in the Peregrine neighborhood, it was dedicated on August 7, 1999.
