= University of Colorado Colorado Springs =

Public research university in Colorado, US

- Motto: ΛΑΜΨΑΤΩ ΤΟ ΦΏΣ ΥΜΏΝ
- Motto in English: Let Your Light Shine
- Type: Public research university
- Established: 1965; 61 years ago
- Parent institution: University of Colorado system
- Academic affiliations: CUMU; Space-grant
- Endowment: $1.5 billion (systemwide)
- Chancellor: Jennifer Sobanet
- President: Todd Saliman
- Faculty: 720 (fall 2025)
- Students: 9,901 (fall 2026)
- Undergraduates: 8,071 (fall 2026)
- Postgraduates: 1,830 (fall 2026)
- Location: Colorado Springs, Colorado, U.S. 38.894°N 104.803°W
- Campus: Urban, 520 acres (210 ha)
- Newspaper: The Scribe
- Colors: Black & gold
- Nickname: Mountain Lions
- Sporting affiliations: NCAA Division II – Rocky Mountain
- Mascot: Clyde
- Website: www.uccs.edu

The University of Colorado Colorado Springs (UCCS) is a public research university in Colorado Springs, Colorado, United States. It is one of four campuses that make up the University of Colorado system. As of fall 2023, UCCS had over 11,000 students, including more than 9,000 undergraduates and nearly 2,000 graduate students. It is classified among "R2: Doctoral Universities – High research activity".

== History ==
The campus history begins with the creation of Cragmor Sanatorium, which is now Main Hall. In 1902, William Jackson Palmer donated funds to build a sanatorium (a place for treatment, rehabilitation, and therapy for the chronically ill). The Cragmor Sanatorium opened in 1905 and was nicknamed the "Sun Palace" due to its sun-loving architecture. In the following decades, it developed a following among the cultural elite, and many of its patients were wealthy. However, they were hit hard by the Great Depression in the 1930s and Cragmor suffered from financial distress into the 1940s. It was briefly reinvigorated in the 1950s when a contract with the Bureau of Indian Affairs established Cragmor as a treatment center for Navajos with tuberculosis. About ten years later, the Navajo patients were transferred elsewhere.

As early as 1945, the University of Colorado offered classes in the Colorado Springs area at various locations, mostly Colorado College. By the 1960s, however, a permanent campus was desired.

In 1961, the Committee for the Expansion of the University of Colorado was formed. They submitted a resolution to expand the extension of the university to Colorado Springs. Legislators were favorable. After several more years of local and state meetings in June 1964, the next phase of UCCS's development came about when George Dwire, the executive director of the Cragmor Sanatorium, began formal actions necessary to transfer the assets of the Cragmoor Corporation to the University of Colorado. The solution came when George T. Dwire sold the Cragmor Sanatorium property for $1 to the state, which became the property of the University of Colorado in 1964.

In 1965, UCCS moved to its current location on Austin Bluffs Parkway in the Cragmor neighborhood of Northern Colorado Springs. The campus is located at one of the highest parts of the city.

Because of its ties to Hewlett-Packard, initial university programs focused on engineering and business, and classes were held in the Cragmor Sanatorium building, what is now Main Hall, and Cragmor Hall, a modern expansion of Main Hall. The first building built exclusively for UCCS, Dwire Hall, was not complete until 1972.

A 1997 community referendum merged Beth-El College of Nursing with UCCS. In recent years, programs such as the Network Information and Space Security Center were added to connect the university with the military to improve national security. Other programs, including the CU Institute for Bioenergetics and the Institute for Science and Space Studies, cast an eye toward the future.

In 2001, UCCS purchased an 87,000-square-foot (8,100 m^{2}) building at the corner of Union and Austin Bluffs to house the Beth-El College of Nursing.

== Academics ==
=== College of Letters, Art & Sciences ===
The College of Letters, Arts & Sciences (LAS) at the University of Colorado Colorado Springs (UCCS) is a community of scholars, creators, and changemakers amongst 20 departments with programs offering bachelor's, master's, and doctoral degrees. The departments together, through teaching, research, community engagement and experiential learning, LAS seeks to "unites students across the arts, humanities, social and natural sciences in the pursuit of better understanding what it means to be human". The

=== Helen and Arthur E. Johnson Beth-El College of Nursing and Health Sciences ===
The Helen and Arthur E. Johnson Beth-El College of Nursing and Health Sciences consists of three departments: Health Sciences, Human Physiology and Nutrition, and Nursing.

The college originated in 1904, when a group of women in the Colorado Springs community founded a nursing school at the base of Pikes Peak. In 1997, Beth-El College of Nursing officially became part of the University of Colorado Colorado Springs. In 2015, the college was renamed the Helen and Arthur E. Johnson Beth-El College of Nursing and Health Sciences and offers bachelor's, master's, and doctorate degrees, as well as numerous academic certificates.

Academic programs are located in University Hall, the Lane Center for Academic Health Sciences, and the William J. Hybl Sports Medicine and Performance Center. The Hybl Center combines academics, research, sports performance, and sports medicine, and operates through a partnership between UCCS and CommonSpirit Health. The facility also houses EXOS, a human performance company.

Johnson Beth-El maintains several academic partnerships, including the Hybrid Doctor of Physical Therapy (DPT) program offered jointly with the University of Colorado Anschutz Campus and a Pre-Pharmacy track that aligns undergraduate coursework with CU Anschutz admission requirements. The Master of Sciences degree in Nutrition and Dietetics includes a coordinated clinical apprentice program with CommonSpirit Penrose-St. Francis Health Services. The college also collaborates with UCHealth Memorial Hospital through the Health Care Science – Radiologic Technologist Bachelor of Science program, which integrates hospital-based clinical education with UCCS coursework. The college's nursing programs are accredited by the Commission on Collegiate Nursing Education (CCNE) and approved by the Colorado State Board of Nursing. The college also holds accreditations by the Society for Simulation in Healthcare (SSH), the Accreditation Council for Education in Nutrition and Dietetics (ACEND) of the Academy of Nutrition and Dietetics, and the Commission on Accreditation of Athletic Training Education (CAATE). We have been recognized as Military Friendly school as online programs for veterans. The college is also recognized as a Military Friendly® School for its strong support of veterans and commitment to accessible online education.

=== College of Business and Administration ===
The College of Business and Administration is the UCCS business school and is located in Dwire Hall. The college was established in 1905. It is accredited by the Association to Advance Collegiate Schools of Business.

=== College of Education ===
The College of Education is the UCCS school of education. The College of Education was previously located in Columbine Hall on the UCCS campus; it has since relocated to University Hall down at the intersection of Austin Bluffs Parkway and Union Boulevard. It is accredited by the Council for the Accreditation of Educator Preparation (CAEP), the Colorado Department of Education (CDE), the Colorado Commission on Higher Education (CCHE) and the Council for Accreditation of Counseling and Related Educational Programs (CACREP). It is primarily a Colorado state educator licensure program.

=== College of Public Service ===
The College of Public Service offers degrees in criminal justice, public administration and social work. UCCS CPS is located in the Academic Office Building on the UCCS Campus. UCCS College of Public Service offers the only Master of Public Administration NASPAA (Network of Schools of Public Policy, Affairs, and Administration) accredited program in the Pikes Peak Region.

=== College of Engineering and Applied Science ===
The College of Engineering and Applied Science is the UCCS engineering college. In the U.S. News & World Report "America’s Best Colleges," the 2008 college rankings edition, "the magazine’s editors ranked the UCCS undergraduate engineering program ninth in the nation among public engineering schools offering bachelor’s or master’s degrees."

UCCS College of Engineering and Applied Science consists of three departments: the Department of Computer Science (computer science); the Department of Electrical and Computer Engineering (electrical engineering, computer engineering), and the Department of Mechanical and Aerospace Engineering (mechanical engineering, aerospace engineering). The college is accredited by the Accreditation Board for Engineering and Technology (ABET). In conjunction with the College of Business it offers the unique Bachelor of Innovation which won the 2008 ASEE new program innovation award.

Thanks to the college's proximity to U.S. government and military installations and the technology private sector, the college has partnerships with several institutions, including defense contractors and semiconductor manufacturers (Intel, Boeing, Agilent, Northrop Grumman, Lockheed Martin), United States Department of Energy National Laboratories (Los Alamos and Sandia), and the military (United States Northern Command, Air Force Space Command, and the United States Air Force Academy).

The college makes use of two buildings on campus:

- The Engineering Building houses the Department of Computer Science, Department of Electrical and Computer Engineering, dean's office, Advanced Development and UNIX Laboratory, Specialized Software Development Laboratory, Software Development Laboratory, Communications and Signal Processing Laboratory, Control Systems Laboratory, Electronics Laboratory, Electromagnetics Laboratory, Microelectronics Research Laboratories (MRL), and VLSI Circuit Design Laboratory.
- In 2009 a $56.1-million Science and Engineering Building was completed at the center of campus to add needed laboratory and lecture space for the Department of Mechanical and Aerospace Engineering as well as the Physics, Chemistry, and Biology departments. It holds an expanded computer, wind tunnel, fluids, instrumentation, and other mechanical engineering laboratories with an enlarged machine shop and research space, design studios with payload and project areas. The building was later named Osborne Center for Science and Engineering after its most significant donors, Ed and Mary Osborne.

== Institutes ==
=== Cybersecurity ===
The University of Colorado Colorado Springs offers academic programs in cybersecurity and related fields. The university reports partnerships with entities within the University of Colorado system, as well as with government, nonprofit, academic, and industry organizations, to support its cybersecurity curriculum. UCCS offers multiple degree and certificate programs focused on cybersecurity at the undergraduate and graduate levels.

=== El Pomar Institute for Innovation and Commercialization ===
The El Pomar Institute for Innovation and Commercialization (EPIIC) is an initiative that supports research and innovation through community partnership and engagement at UCCS.

=== Excel Centers ===
The Excel Centers at UCCS are a group of academic support centers available to undergraduate and graduate students across disciplines. The centers include the Languages Center, Mathematics Center, Science Center, and Multiliteracy Center, which provide tutoring and instructional support in their respective subject areas.

=== T. Rowe Price Career and Innovation Center ===
The T. Rowe Price Career and Innovation Center provides career development services to UCCS students and alumni. Services include assistance with major and career exploration, internship and job searches, and interview preparation.

=== Research ===
In 2019, UCCS was classified by the Carnegie Foundation for the Advancement of Teaching as a doctoral institution with High Research Activity (R2). Faculty, students, and staff at the university participate in research activities including grant‑funded projects, scholarly publications, creative works, and conference presentations. Research support services are coordinated through the UCCS Office of Research.

== Campus buildings ==
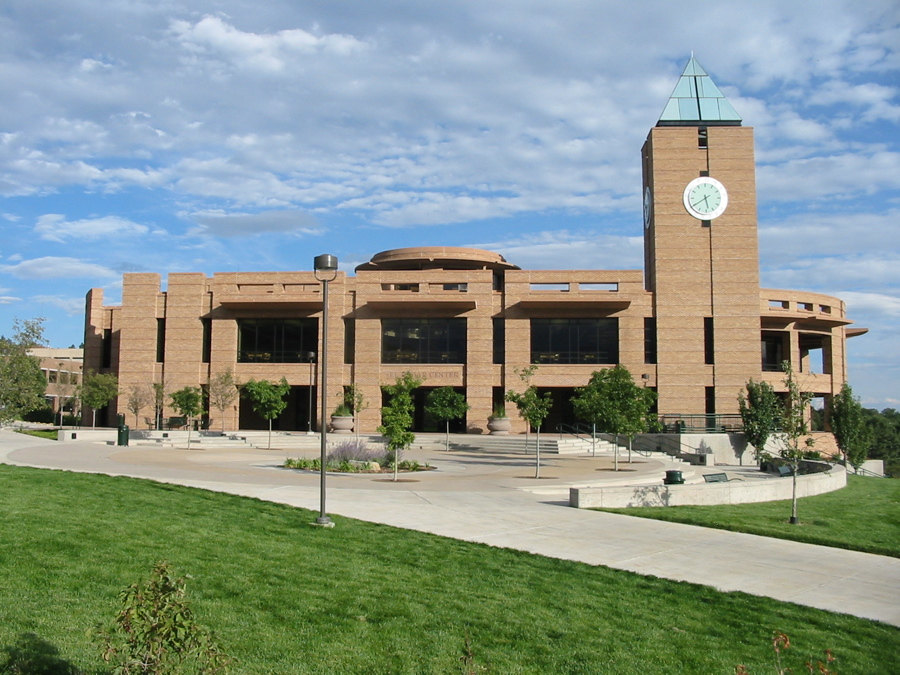
Kraemer Library

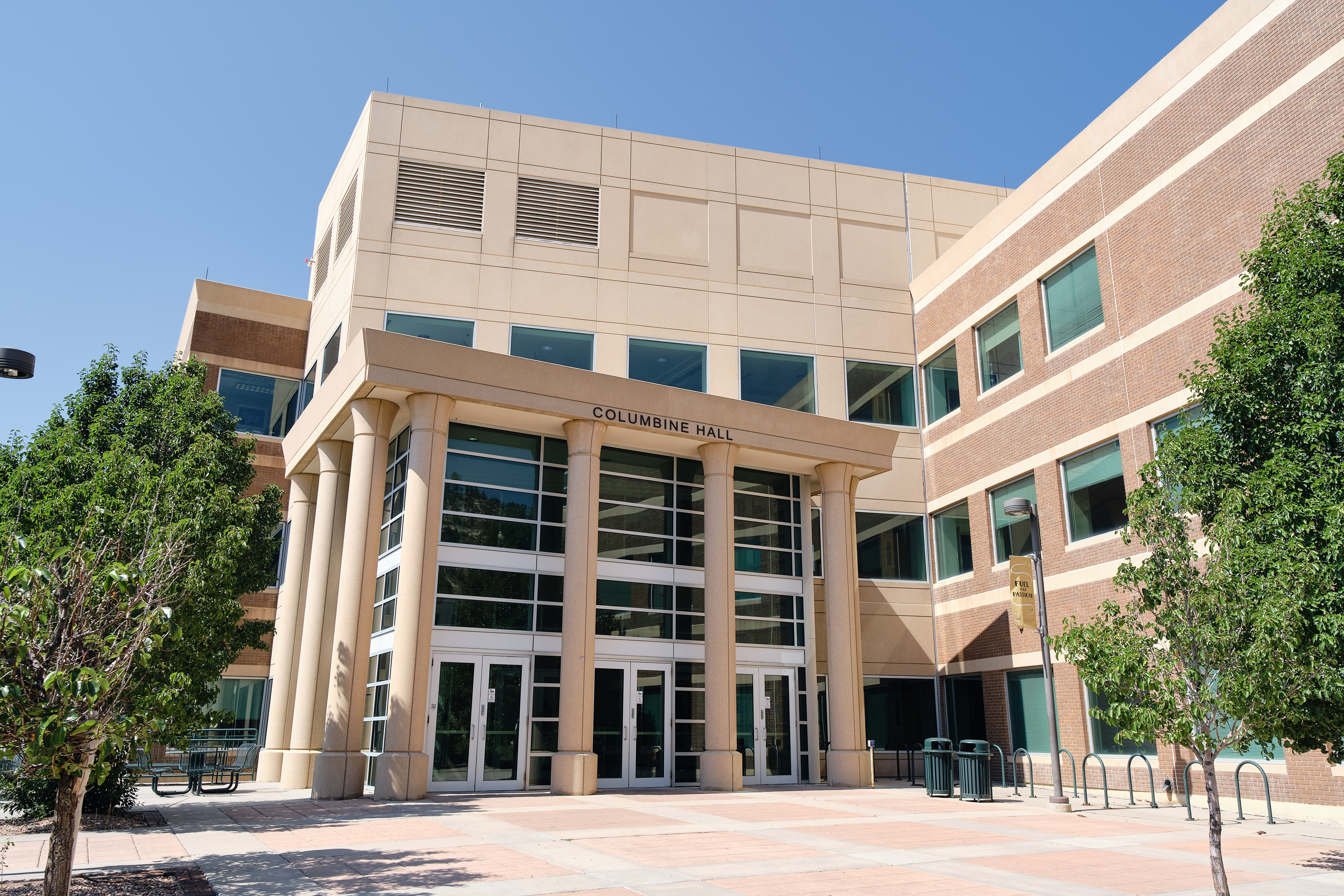
Columbine Hall

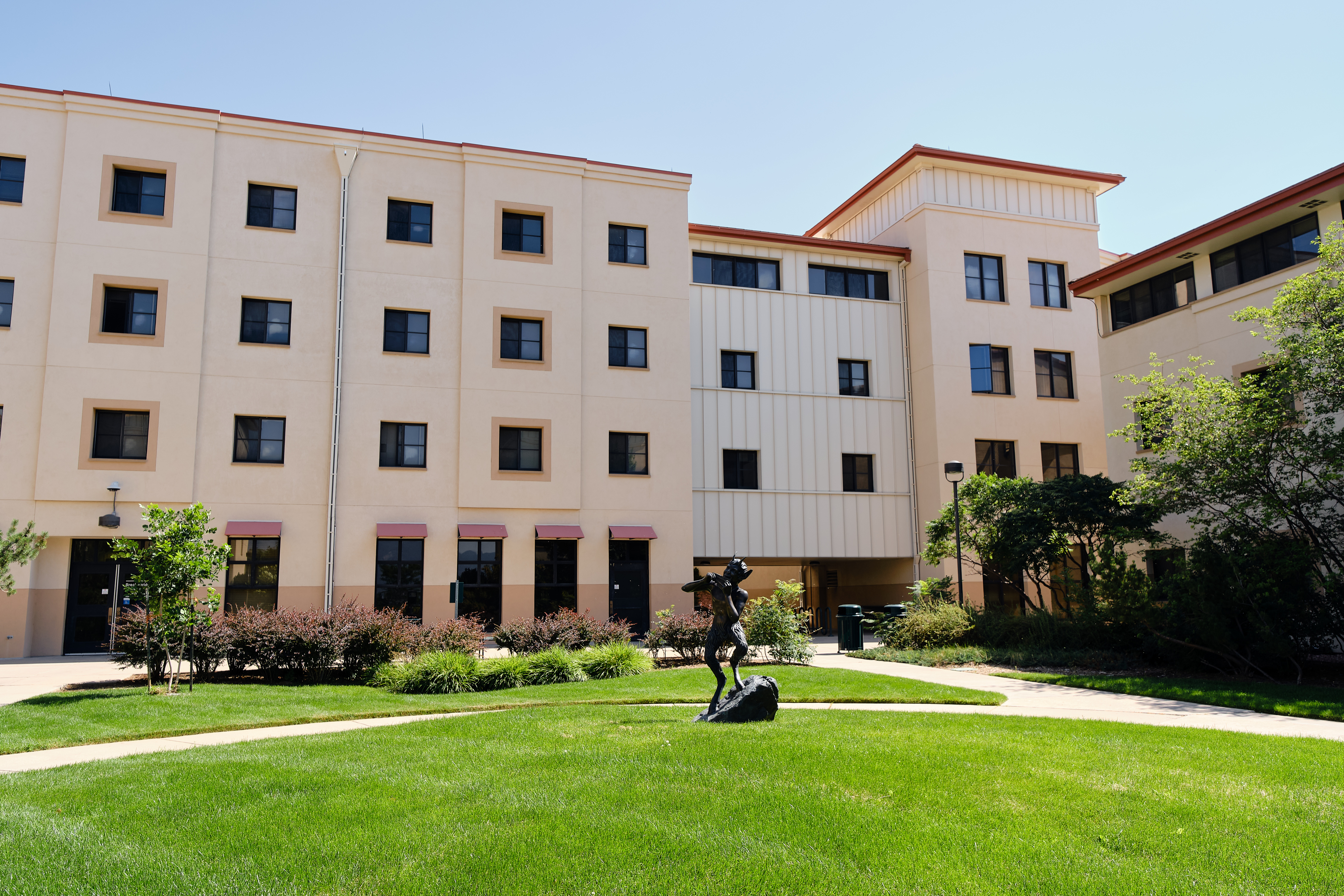
Summit Village

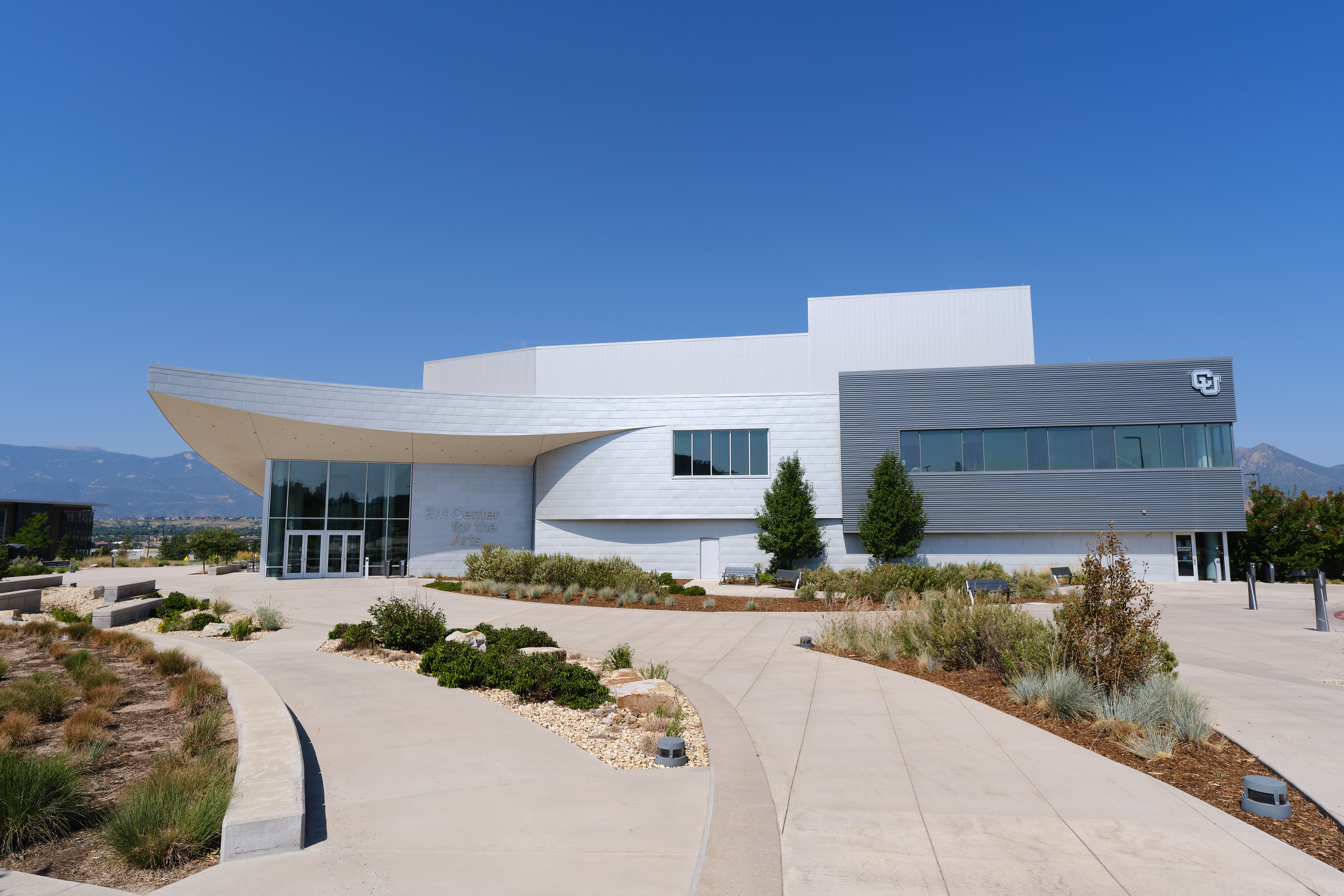
Ent Center for the Arts

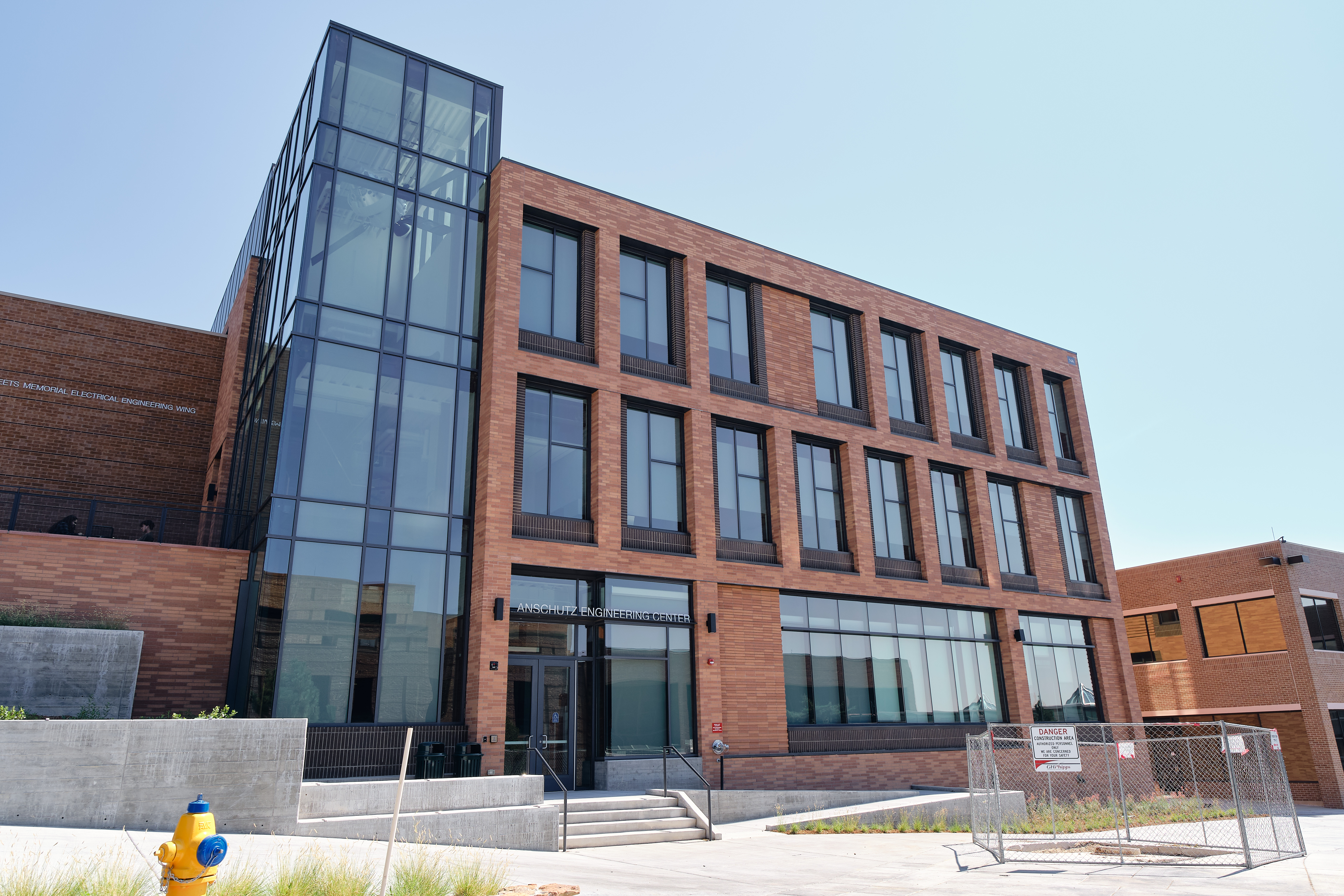
Anschutz Engineering Center

- Main Hall (1914) – Administration building containing the Bursar's office, admissions, academic advising, disability services, etc.
- Cragmor Hall (1959) – Administration building containing orientation, admissions, student employment, and financial aid.
- Dwire Hall (1972) – Renovated in 2007, Dwire Hall was the first academic building. It now serves as the classroom and office spaces for the College of Business and Languages and Cultures.
- The El Pomar Center (1975) – Home to the Kraemer Family Library and technical support. Renovated at the beginning of the millennium to expand the library and add the University Center.
- Engineering and Applied Sciences (1985) – One of two buildings in which the College of Engineering and Applied Science operates, this building is home to various labs with national acclaim.
- Columbine Hall (1997) – The new home for most LAS classes, also containing writing center, communications lab, and a lecture hall.
- Summit Village (1997) – This was the first of UCCS's student housing, including Monarch, Breckenridge, Keystone, Vail, Telluride, Steamboat and Aspen. Subsequent buildings were constructed in phases, including the Alpine Apartments in 2004, Copper/Eldora in 2013, and the LaPlata, Cucharas, and San Juan buildings in 2015–2016.
- Family Development Center (1997) - The center provides comprehensive child care for children aged 1 to 11, including toddler care, preschool, kindergarten transition programs, and summer camps for school-age children.
- University Center (2001) – Addition to El Pomar, this is the center of campus life where activities and seminars are held. The information desk, campus store, the Scribe, Student Life, and MOSAIC offices are housed in the lower level.
- University Hall (2001) – Home to the College of Education and Johnson Beth-El College of Nursing and Health Sciences.
- Osborne Center for Science and Engineering (2009) – This building was designed by AR7 Architects (now NAC Architecture) and provides a twofold expansion of science and engineering classrooms and facilities.
- Centennial Hall (2010) – Originally built and opened in 1980, this building was rebuilt in 2010 and is now home to departments of Chemistry, Biochemistry, Anthropology, Geography, and Environmental Studies,
- Gallogly Events Center (2010) – This venue is a 1,250-seat facility that opened in 2010, and features state-of-the-art sound and lighting, high-speed data capability, Daktronics scoreboards, digital score tables, improved seating, large visitor's and officials locker rooms, dedicated VIP area, and is wired to comfortably host television broadcasts.
- Heller Center (2010) - A renovated 1940s home, this space provides a refuge for creativity.
- Alpine Parking Garage & Recreational Field (2014) - This site added more than 1,200 new parking spots, as well as two multi-purpose turf athletic fields on the roof.
- Academic Office Building (2014) – Houses several departments of the College of Letters, Arts and Sciences as well as the School of Public Affairs.
- The Lane Center (2014) –The Lane Center for Academic Health Sciences opened as a branch of the CU School of Medicine.
- Sustainability Demonstration House (2015) - Operates as an educational center where visitors can learn about reducing their carbon footprint through various sustainable practices.
- Gallogly Recreation and Wellness Center (2016) – This space features a swimming pool, a climbing wall, and a full basketball court, along with the Wellness Center, counseling services, and more.
- Ent Center (2018) - Home to the Visual and Performing Arts classes. Also hosts some events for the students, and also is sometimes used by the Colorado Springs Philharmonic orchestra.
- Hybl Sports Medicine and Performance Center (2020) - A first-of-its-kind facility, designed with intentional “collision spaces” for collaboration between medical doctors, faculty researchers and students.
- Anschutz Engineering Center (2024) - New annex to the current Engineering and Applied Sciences building.

== Athletics ==
UCCS competes in NCAA Division II in the Rocky Mountain Athletic Conference (RMAC), fielding teams in men's basketball, women's basketball, women's volleyball, men's cross country, women's cross country, men's indoor track and field, women's indoor track and field, men's outdoor track and field, women's outdoor track and field, men's golf, men's soccer, women's soccer, women's softball and women's lacrosse.

The school mascot is the mountain lion, Clyde, with official colors of gold and black, the same school colors of CU-Boulder (black, gold and silver).

== Student life ==
Undergraduate demographics as of Fall 2023
Race and ethnicity	Total
White	60%
Hispanic	21%
Two or more races	8%
Black	5%
Asian	4%
Unknown	2%
International student	1%
Economic diversity
Low-income (Note: The percentage of students who received an income-based federal Pell grant intended for low-income students.)	28%
Affluent (Note: The percentage of students who are a part of the American middle class at the bare minimum.)	72%

=== Student publications ===
- The official campus newspaper is The Scribe, since 1966.
- The university is home to Writers' Forum, a national literary journal founded in 1974.
- URJ-UCCS: Undergraduate Research Journal at UCCS
- riverrun is the student literary and arts journal published annually. They take poetry, fiction, nonfiction, and visual art submissions. riverrun must never be capitalized because it is a reference to the first word of the book Finnegans Wake, which starts in the middle of a sentence. The beginning of the sentence is at the end of the book.

== Notable students, alumni, and staff ==
- Max Aaron - 2013 U.S. national champion figure skater
- Steve Bach (B.S. in business) - former Colorado Springs Mayor, first "Strong Mayor"
- Jason Brown - 2015 U.S. national champion figure skater and Olympic bronze medalist
- Teresa A. H. Djuric (M.A. in Curriculum and Instruction, 1994) - U.S. Air Force Brigadier General
- John Herrington (B.A. in mathematics, 1983) - first Native American to go to space, aboard Space Shuttle Endeavour in 2002
- Jugal Kalita - computer science professor, Language Information and Computation (LINC) Lab
- Yusef Komunyakaa (B.A. 1975) - first African-American to win Pulitzer Prize for poetry
- James Lansford - fellow of the Institute of Electrical and Electronics Engineers
- Mary Lou Makepeace (M.P.A. 1979) - first female mayor of Colorado Springs, serving from 1997 to 2003
- Charlee Minkin (born 1981), Olympic judoka
- John Morse (B.S. in business, M.P.A. 1996) - former president of the Colorado Senate
- Mirai Nagasu - 2008 U.S. national champion figure skater and 2010 Olympian
- Apolo Ohno - speed skater, most decorated American Winter Olympic athlete of all time
- Raquel Pennington - professional mixed martial arts fighter, competing in the UFC's bantamweight division
- Trevor Rainbolt - Social media personality
- Alexander Soifer - Mathematician and professor
- Garrett Swasey - UCCS police officer who died in the line of duty at age 44 during the Colorado Springs Planned Parenthood shooting
- Derrick White - basketball player
- Gabby Windey - television personality
