= Austin Bluffs, Colorado =

American summit

Coordinates: 38°54′3.98″N 104°47′59.91″W

External images
- Austin Bluffs Open Space: University Park
- Austin Bluffs Open Space, view of Pikes Peak
- Austin Bluffs Open Space: Pulpit Rock
- Austin Bluffs, looking west to Rampart Range

Austin Bluffs is a summit in the Pikeview area of Colorado Springs in El Paso County, Colorado, at 6,673 feet (2,034 m) in elevation. It is also a residential area, that was once a settlement and the site of a tuberculosis sanatorium. The University of Colorado Colorado Springs campus was moved there in 1965. The summit also lends its name to a principal arterial road of the Colorado Springs area which traverses the southern and central sections of the corridor. It divides the Austin Bluffs open space from Palmer Park, and the Templeton Gap is located here as well.

== Geology ==
The rock in Austin Bluffs is from the Dawson Arkose, Arapahoe Formation, Denver Formation, and Eocene period of the Tertiary. Sedimentary sandstone and arkosic sandstone formations are evident due to a geological uplift in the area about 65 to 70 million years ago. Due to its rock formations, the United States Forest Service has deemed the open space as unique in the National Feature Inventory.

== History ==
There is archaeological evidence that Native Americans lived in the Austin Bluffs area thousands of years ago, and perhaps as early as 10,000 years ago. There are more than a dozen sites that show that the area was used to quarry for stone for lithic tools. There are 30 sites that show signs of occupation between 100 and 1,400 AD by Plains Indians, including evidence of charcoal fires, on the west side of the University of Colorado Colorado Springs. There are also stone enclosures that may have been Ute vision quest sites. (Note: Another theory is that they could have been built by Hispanic shepherds employed by Henry Austin.)

In the 1870s, the Atchison, Topeka and Santa Fe Railway operated a railroad line along Monument Creek and what is now the western edge of the campus. Matt France sold the prairie land and bluffs that he owned northeast of Colorado Springs in 1873 to Henry Austin. Out West reported on November 7, 1872, that Mr. Austin of Chicago had purchased 5,200 acres [2,100 ha] of land on the northeastern boundary of the newly formed Colorado Springs. Austin, for whom Austin Bluffs are named, was a wealthy sheep ranch owner of 3,000 acres (1,200 ha). (Note: Austin had come to the Colorado Springs area from Chicago in 1871 with landscape architect John Blair who was hired by William Jackson Palmer to lay out the town of Manitou Springs.) Austin hired Hispanic shepherds from southern Colorado and New Mexico to tend his sheep in the 1880s. Photographer Laura Gilpin was born in Austin Bluffs, which was more accessible for a doctor than the family ranch on Horse Creek.

Austin Bluffs began to be annexed into the city of Colorado Springs beginning December 1888 and in many sections from 1894 to 2013. (Note: There was also an area called Austin Heights that was annexed in 1951.) In 1890, plans to make Austin Bluffs were underway: the area had its own water system, had laid out the lots for residential housing, and was added to Colorado Springs trolley service. Water was piped to the area from West Monument Creek by the Austin Bluffs Land and Water Company. (Note: In 1888, a right-of-way was granted to the Austin Bluffs Land and Water Company, which installed water pipes across the property that is now the UCCS campus. Colorado Springs used this as a water supply until 1969.)

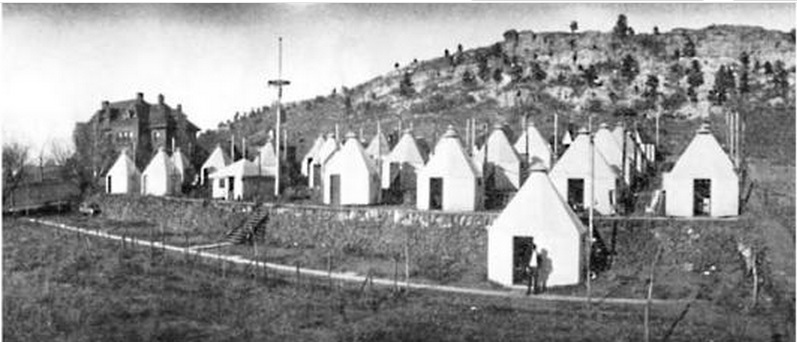
Nordach Sanatorium, Austin Bluffs, Colorado 1906, Special Collections, Pikes Peak Library District

In 1901, Dr. John E. White opened the Nordrach Ranch Sanatorium. Located at Austin Bluff, patients lodged in tents, were exposed to fresh air, had limited physical activity, and ate well. The regimen was based upon a German sanatorium that had seen good results with this approach.

The Keystone Fuel Company of Colorado Springs operated the Austin Bluffs Mine, a lignite coal mine in Austin Bluffs, by 1905. By 1910, new tipple and machinery were installed. One mile (1.6 km) east of Highway 85-87 (Nevada Avenue), on the southwest side of the bluffs, was a place where red and brown agate and cherry red carnelian were collected.

The Cragmor Sanatorium, a tuberculosis clinic and nursing home, operated in Austin Bluffs in the early 1900s. Land that was owned by Henry Austin is now part of the University of Colorado Colorado Springs campus. (Note: In 1907, William Jackson Palmer bought property owned by Henry Austin, and it was donated to the city for a park in 1909 by the executors of his estate. The park, which is just south of Austin Bluffs Parkway, is named Palmer Park.) In 1965, the 80-acre (32 ha) sanatorium was sold by George J. Dwire to the University of Colorado for one dollar to build an extension campus in Colorado Springs. It has since grown into a 532-acre (215 ha) campus.

== University of Colorado ==
University of Colorado Colorado Springs (UCCS) has an annual enrollment of about 10,500 students with a staff and faculty of about 1,000 people. The campus has residential housing, a library, and a science and engineering center. Historic buildings are Dwire Hall, Cragmor Hall, and the original Main Hall. Other facilities include a recreation center, sports complex, theatre, events center, and a family development center.

== Open Space ==
The Austin Bluffs Open Space is a 584-acre (236 ha) park north of Austin Bluffs, east of Nevada Avenue, and west of Union Boulevard. It includes Austin Bluffs, University Park, and Pulpit Rock open space areas. There are two trails through the park. (Note: The acquisition of the property was made possible due to the Palmer Foundation, private land owner donation, Great Outdoors Colorado, the City of Colorado Springs TOPS Program and the citizens of Colorado Springs.)
