= Historic Uptown =

Historic Uptown Neighborhood
- Location within Colorado
- Former names: Near North End Neighborhood

General information
- Type: Townsite
- Location: Colorado Springs, United States
- Coordinates: 38.83737694625225°N 104.82244075458745°W
- Groundbreaking: 1871
- Governing body: Historic Uptown Neighborhood Board

Website
- historicuptown.org

The Historic Uptown neighborhood is located in the city of Colorado Springs, Colorado, United States. The neighborhood's boundaries are Cache La Poudre St. to the north, Bijou St. to the south, the alley situated between Wahsatch Ave. and Corona St. to the east, and Monument Valley Park to the west. It was called the Near North End neighborhood until 2023 when it was renamed to the Historic Uptown Neighborhood by the Historic Uptown Neighborhood Board to avoid confusion with the Old North End Neighborhood.

Situated directly north of downtown Colorado Springs, an array of amenities are easily accessible on foot, ranging from parks and restaurants to boutiques, museums, performing arts centers, sports facilities, and more.

== History ==
Originally part of the initial townsite established in 1871 and later expanded in 1873, the Historic Uptown Neighborhood boasts a rich historical legacy. It holds a notable presence on the National Register of Historic Places, with key districts such as the Weber-Wahsatch Historic District, Boulder Crescent District, Monument Valley Park, and many other historically significant buildings.

General William J. Palmer and his Colorado Springs Company devised the city plan with the aim of creating a resort-like atmosphere, targeting affluent individuals from the eastern United States and the British Isles. The development along N. Cascade, N. Tejon, and N. Nevada avenues serves as a testament to the transformation from a frontier town to a well-established community with modern conveniences.

The Historic Uptown Neighborhood encompasses part of the original town site and Addition #1 (1871), which expanded to the north, south, and east. In 1883, Addition #5 was plotted west of Cascade Ave. with curvilinear streets and picturesque sites overlooking Monument Creek—a rare and elaborate street design for a Western community. This design reflected the concerted efforts of the town company to impart a distinctive and charming character to their settlement.

The 1880s witnessed the city's most significant population growth, increasing by 11,140 residents (164% growth) by 1890. Immigrants were drawn in by promotional efforts and the city's favorable health conditions. The construction of architecturally rich structures, representing styles such as Queen Anne, Shingle, Italianate, and Tudor, adorned the main thoroughfares north of downtown toward Colorado College. Churches were also erected, embodying the envisioned culture and refinement by General Palmer.

The 1890s to the early 20th century marked a second phase of development following the Cripple Creek and Victor gold mining boom. Opulent houses built during this period reflected the wealth of mine owners, merchants, and industrialists drawn to the mining industry. Architectural styles ranged from Tudor stone castles to Mediterranean Palazzos and Spanish Mission haciendas.

Historic Uptown underwent changes over the years, with economic crises in the 1930s leading to the conversion of large residences into boarding houses or apartments. Housing shortages post-World War II contributed to further conversions, and businesses repurposed residential properties for commercial use. The area stands as a testament to the historical evolution of Colorado Springs, with buildings over fifty years old selected for description based on their eligibility for listing in the National Register of Historic Places, State Register of Historic Properties, or local historical significance.

== Historic Districts ==
=== Boulder Crescent Historic District ===
The Boulder Crescent Historic District, situated in the northeastern portion of the block bounded by Boulder Street, Cascade Avenue, Boulder Crescent, and Monument Valley Park in Colorado Springs, is characterized by its collection of five contributing residential buildings constructed between 1894 and 1901. Enveloped within the mature landscaping of the commercial core, the district showcases a mix of architectural styles, including Dutch Colonial Revival, late Victorian, and Colonial Revival. Despite minor alterations, these two to two-and-a-half-story wood-frame structures offer a historical glimpse into the turn of the century in Colorado Springs. Notable properties within the district include 11 West Boulder Street, exemplifying the Colonial Revival style, and 320 North Cascade Avenue, featuring Queen Anne elements. The district's significance lies in its representation of the late 19th and early 20th-century residential development, fueled by a construction boom spurred by the influx of people drawn to the region's health benefits and scenic beauty. Preserving the area's historical character, the district serves as a testament to Colorado Springs' rapid growth during this transformative period.

=== Weber-Wahsatch Historic District ===
The North Weber Street-Wahsatch Avenue Historic District, situated just north of downtown Colorado Springs, boasts a rich architectural and cultural heritage that spans from the late 19th century to the mid-20th century. During the turn of the century, the area witnessed the construction of various rental housing forms, including duplexes and multi-family units like those at 709-711 North Wahsatch and a block of row houses, a unique addition related to the extension of the streetcar line along North Tejon Street and North Nevada Avenue. The neighborhood also saw the establishment of essential services, such as the 1896 City Fire Department's Company No. 2 station and the grand Cumberland Presbyterian church at North Weber Street and Cheyenne Avenue. Additionally, the period witnessed the rise of commercial buildings, predominantly at block corners, housing grocery stores, drugstores, and other essential services.

The early 20th century brought forth challenges of rapid growth, prompting civic organizations like the Civic League to advocate for comprehensive planning. In response, "Colorado Springs, The City Beautiful," a plan crafted by planning consultant Charles Mulford Robinson, advocated the continued landscaping of the Avenue medians, adding raised dividers along Wahsatch Avenue and Willamette Avenue to Cascade Avenue and Nevada Avenue medians in the 1910s. The district continued to be a desirable residential area, witnessing limited but high-quality construction, exemplified by the 1924 Calvary Evangelical church at Uintah Street and Wahsatch Avenue.

The neighborhood evolved in the 1910-1935 period, marked by the prevalence of bungalows, often part of small developments or sandwiched among older Victorian homes. Notable was the transition in landscaping and outdoor living spaces, with smaller front yards reflecting the changing cultural practices of the time. Post-World War II, however, saw shifts in the neighborhood's character, with larger homes converted to multi-family dwellings, and southern portions repurposed for commercial use. Unfortunately, deferred maintenance and misguided modernizations took a toll on the district's historic fabric.

In recent decades, there has been a positive resurgence in the preservation and revitalization of the North Weber Street-Wahsatch Avenue Historic District. New households have moved in, contributing to a substantial reinvestment in the area's buildings. Efforts have been made to restore homes to their original appearances, reversing the trend of deterioration that threatened the neighborhood's integrity. Today, the district stands as a testament to Colorado Springs' early history, providing a unique sense of time and place, and its recognition on the National Register emphasizes the importance of preserving this historic enclave for future generations.

== Notable Structures ==
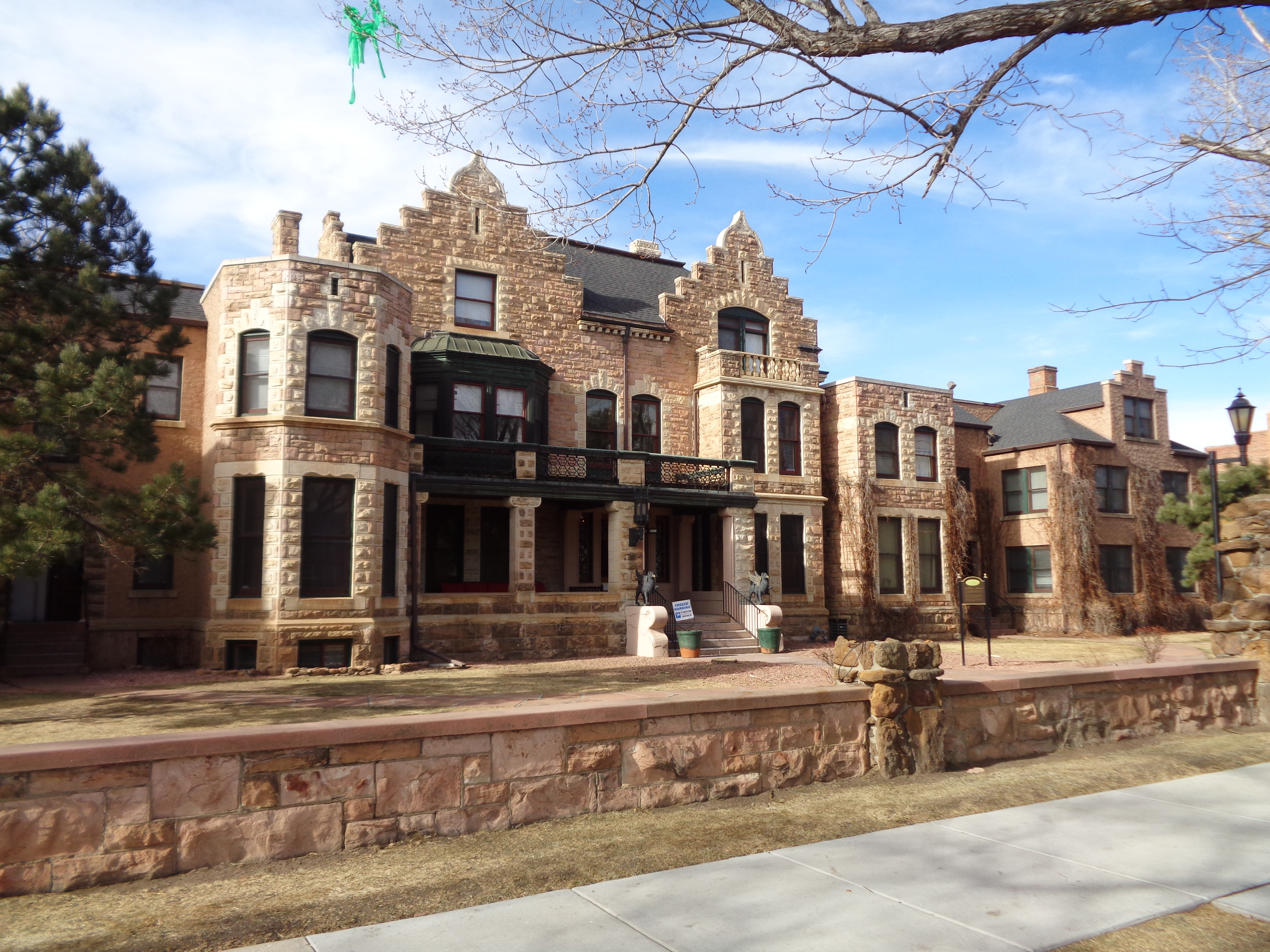
Hagerman Mansion, 610 N Cascade Avenue

=== Hagerman Mansion ===
Constructed in 1885 by Colorado railroad magnate James John Hagerman, the Hagerman Mansion stands proudly at 610 North Cascade Avenue in Colorado Springs. Originally designed as a splendid stone Victorian eclectic mansion, significant alterations were made in 1927, transforming it into a luxury apartment building with 22 units while preserving its architectural integrity. The three-story mansion faces east and features a "T-shaped" plan, with the original 1885 structure augmented by additions before 1899 and further expansions in 1927. The exterior showcases pink, rock-faced sandstone, with notable design elements such as stepped parapet gable ends and a two-story, half-round tower added before 1899. The interiors boast rich materials and exquisite craftsmanship, particularly on the first floor, where rooms radiate from a central hall, displaying medium-stained oak, birch, walnut, and mahogany finishes. The mansion's historical significance lies not only in its architectural grandeur but also in its association with Hagerman, the builder of the Colorado Midland Railway, and its adaptive use as a luxury apartment building in the 1920s, contributing to the architectural heritage of Cascade Avenue.

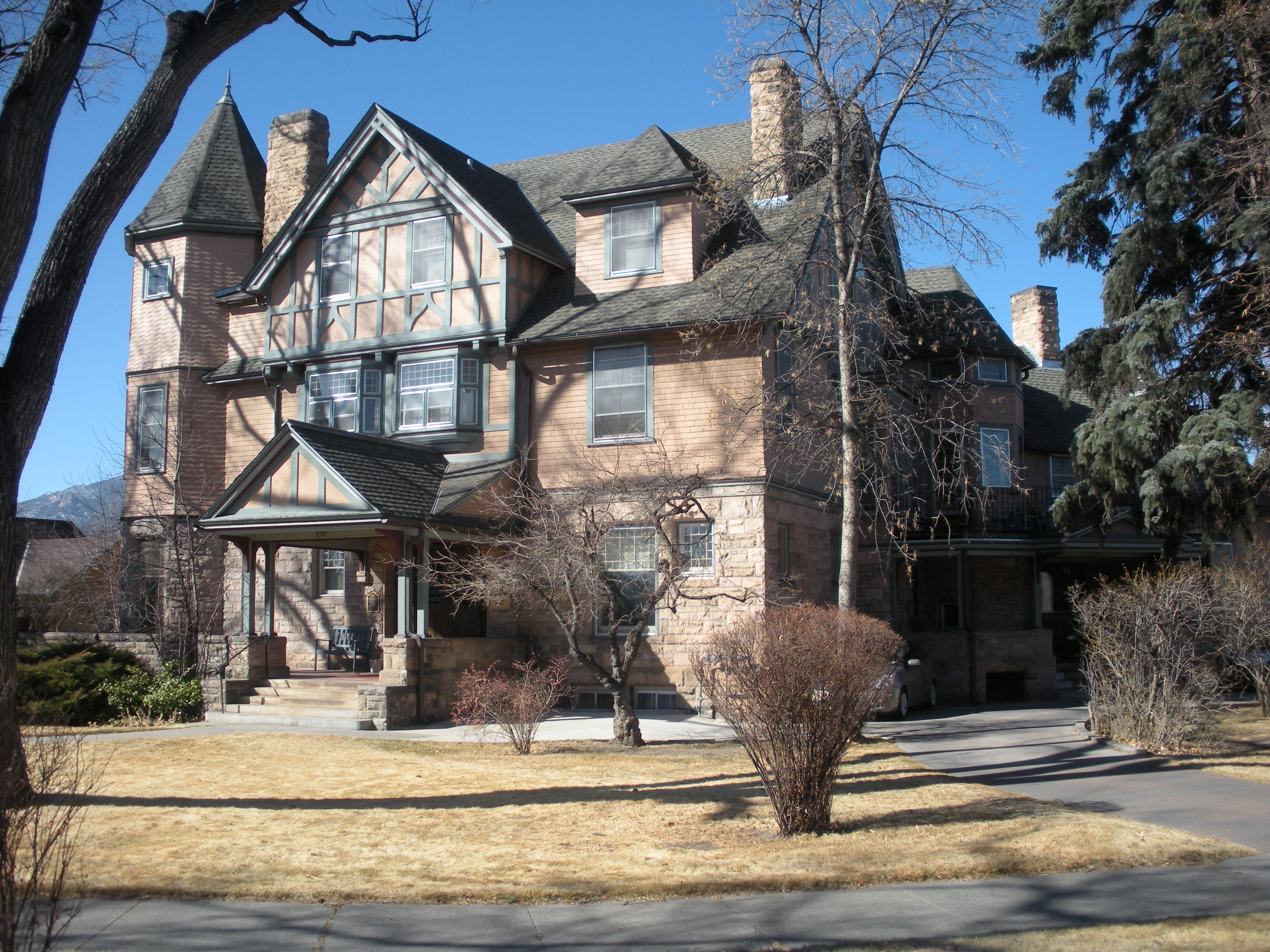
Gwynne-Love House, 730 N Cascade Ave

=== Gwynne-Love House ===
Constructed in 1886, the Gwynne-Love House at 730 North Cascade Avenue stands as an imposing Victorian-era residence, prominently situated on a bluff overlooking Monument Valley Park. This architectural gem, now housing professional offices and apartments, retains its original grandeur and serves as a testament to the affluent lifestyle of its early inhabitants. Exhibiting a combination of Queen Anne forms and English detailing, the house features an irregular, multi-planed roof, a hexagonal tower, and decorative half-timbering, showcasing the distinctive architectural influences of "Little London" in Colorado Springs. The exterior, adorned with rock-faced ashlar, wood shingles, and intricate detailing, further adds to its historic charm.

Noteworthy for its historical and social significance, the Gwynne-Love House has witnessed transformations in ownership and use throughout the past century. Originally commissioned by Edmiston Gwynne, the house became a residence guest house during the turn of the century, adapting to the town's growth spurred by the Cripple Creek gold discovery. Its subsequent role as a private residence for the Love family in the early 1900s contributed to the preservation of its architectural integrity. Today, the house stands as one of the last large, intact historic homes in central Colorado Springs, providing a visual link to the city's early history and earning recognition on the National Register of Historic Places.

=== McAllister House ===
The McAllister House, dating back to 1873–74, stands at 423 North Cascade Avenue as one of the three oldest houses in the Pikes Peak Region and holds particular historical significance. Constructed by Major Henry McAllister, a key figure in the early development of Colorado Springs and a close associate of General William J. Palmer, the house is the sole publicly accessible and meticulously preserved museum in the region. What sets it apart is its restoration to the original architectural plan, distinguishing it as a fine example of late Victorian architecture. Major McAllister's influential role in political, civic, and social spheres, including his contributions to the Denver and Rio Grande Railroad and education, further elevates the house's historical value. Today, owned and maintained by the National Society of Colonial Dames in the State of Colorado, the McAllister House serves as a significant tourist attraction, offering a glimpse into Victorian-era living and hosting educational tours for various groups. Its preservation efforts have been bolstered by substantial gifts and grants, underscoring its enduring importance to both locals and visitors alike. The house remains a cherished venue for meetings, emphasizing its role as a community hub and cultural landmark.

=== Plaza Hotel ===
The Plaza Hotel, constructed in 1901, stands at 830 North Tejon Street as a notable architectural landmark in Colorado Springs, embodying a unique blend of Renaissance Revival and Spanish influences. This four-story H-shaped structure, originally described in Facts Magazine as a "first-class hotel," was designed by local brick masons turned contractors, W. W. and G. F. Atkinson. The building features distinct elements such as twin towers, arched windows, and brick bands resembling stone, contributing to its Renaissance Revival aesthetic. Its historical significance lies in its role as a response to the growth of Colorado College and the booming mining activity in Cripple Creek, reflecting the expansion era of the town and its educational institutions. Over the years, the Plaza Hotel served various purposes, housing women students and accommodating male student overflow during different periods. In 1969, it underwent a transformation into office space, retaining its significance as a key element in the downtown area and the broader Colorado Springs community, both architecturally and historically.

=== Burgess House ===
The Burgess House, situated at 730 North Nevada Avenue on a tree-shaded corner lot just north of downtown Colorado Springs, stands as a historic testament to the city's early settlement period. Built in 1888, this three-story wood structure exemplifies the vernacular Queen Anne style prevalent in late 19th-century Colorado. Noteworthy features include an irregular shape, multiple gable roofs, a prominent corner tower, and decorative detailing such as clapboard, fish-scale, and square shingles. The 1988 rehabilitation preserved the exterior's historic color scheme and repaired deteriorated elements, maintaining the house's architectural integrity.

The interior, featuring poplar woodwork, showcases a well-preserved 1880s design, including a central staircase with turned balusters and decorative detailing throughout. The rehabilitation focused on stabilizing and enhancing significant features while upgrading systems and ensuring compliance with preservation standards. The property includes two historic outbuildings—a child's playhouse dating from the 1870s and a barn used as a carriage house and garage. The Burgess House, listed on the National Register of Historic Places, is historically significant as one of the few remaining examples of early Colorado Springs architecture, representing the prosperous mercantile class in the late 1800s. The property's continuous preservation, recognized with a 1989 Stephen H. Hart Award, contributes to the city's cultural heritage.

=== Grace and St. Stephen's Episcopal Church ===
Grace and St. Stephen's Episcopal Church, located at 631 North Tejon Street in downtown Colorado Springs at the corner of Tejon and Monument Streets, is an architectural gem representing the Gothic Revival and Tudor Revival styles. The church complex, spanning approximately 41,000 square feet, was constructed in three main phases over a period of 60 years. The original St. Stephen's Church, built in 1895, exhibits Gothic Revival characteristics with its pointed arches, stained glass windows, and steep gabled slate roof. In 1925, a sanctuary and bell tower were added, designed in a more elaborate Gothic Revival style. Subsequent Tudor Revival elements were incorporated in the 1955 educational wing. A glass atrium, added in 1993, seamlessly connects the various components. Despite minor alterations, the church retains its architectural integrity, showcasing the work of notable local and national architects. Beyond its architectural significance, the church played a crucial role in shaping the religious and cultural landscape of Colorado Springs, serving as the focal point for Episcopal traditions and outreach activities since its establishment in 1872. Today, Grace and St. Stephen's Episcopal Church stands as a testament to the rich history and enduring legacy of the Episcopal community in the region.

=== Colorado Springs Fine Arts Center ===
The Colorado Springs Fine Arts Center located at 30 West Dale Street is a remarkable architectural gem that seamlessly blends elements of the Southwest, modernism, Art Deco, and classicism. Constructed as a one- and two-level Pueblo-style monolithic poured concrete structure, the building stands as a testament to the vision of its architect, John Gaw Meem. The exterior showcases a multi-level Native American terraced pueblo design, with textured walls and minimal fenestration, situated on a bluff overlooking Pikes Peak. Virtually unchanged since its inception, the building has been meticulously preserved, retaining its important original elements, including massive walls with horizontal wooden concrete form marks and limited exterior decoration.

Internally, the Fine Arts Center is characterized by its use of costly materials and custom-designed details, housing galleries, museum storage space, performing arts facilities, art studios, a museum shop, a library, and offices. The entrance lobby, theater, theater lounge, loggia, library, and music room are outstanding interior areas with unique features such as mahogany flexwood walls, ornamental aluminum panels, and murals by renowned artists like Boardman Robinson and Frank Mechau. A major addition in 1972 provided a fourth side to the courtyard, allowing for improved circulation through the galleries. The Fine Arts Center represents a successful integration of various art activities into a complete art center and remains a lasting symbol of the community's commitment to the preservation and extension of culture. Founded by philanthropist Alice Bemis Taylor, the center's historical importance is deeply intertwined with its role in enriching the cultural life of Colorado Springs since its opening in 1936. The building's unique design, recognized with the silver medal at the Fifth Pan American Congress of Architecture in 1940, reflects Meem's ability to combine regional style with modernism, resulting in a timeless architectural masterpiece.

=== First Congregational Church ===
The First Congregational Church at 20 East St. Vrain Street in Colorado Springs was established in 1874. The church holds historical significance as a key player in the creation and development of Colorado College and is a reflection of the vision of city founder William Jackson Palmer. Designed by architect Henry Rutgers Marshall, the church stands as a notable example of Richardsonian Romanesque architecture in Colorado Springs, featuring distinctive elements such as a Greek cross plan, a tower inspired by Trinity Church in Boston, and high-quality craftsmanship. Its architectural significance extends to being one of only two known churches designed by Marshall in the country. The church played a crucial role in supporting Colorado College during its early years and remains a symbol of the Richardsonian Romanesque style's impact on institutional architecture in the state. Today, it continues to serve as a house of worship while being recognized for its historical associations, architectural merits, and enduring ties to the community.

=== Judson Moss Bemis House ===
The Judson Moss Bemis House, located at 506 North Cascade Avenue in Colorado Springs, stands as a remarkable example of late Victorian architecture, built in 1885 by architect W. F. Ellis. Combining Queen Anne style with elements of Stick Style and hints of Federal or Colonial influences, the house boasts a distinctive and irregular design. Originally a three-story structure with 10 rooms, the building underwent additions in 1886 and 1887, completing its present form. Noteworthy features include cut random ashlar masonry foundations, cedar clapboard siding, and ornate gables with decorative elements. Renovated in 1935 to house 10 apartments, the Bemis House has since been meticulously restored by architects William Odum and Al Feinstein.

The house holds historical significance as the residence of Judson Moss Bemis, founder of the J.M. Bemis Company, and his wife Alice Cogswell Bemis. Judson Bemis, a philanthropist and business leader, played a vital role in the community, contributing to Colorado College and establishing the School of Business Administration and Banking. Their daughter, Alice Bemis Taylor, continued the family's legacy as a philanthropist, supporting education, child care, and the arts. The house remained in the family for decades, witnessing the generous contributions of Alice Bemis Taylor, including the donation of the Colorado Springs Fine Arts Center during the Great Depression. Today, the Bemis House stands as a well-preserved testament to Victorian architecture and the influential individuals who shaped Colorado Springs' history.
