= La Foret, Colorado =

Coordinates: 39°00′34″N 104°42′52″W

- Interactive map of La Foret, Colorado
- Country: United States
- State: Colorado
- County: El Paso
- Elevation: 7,231 ft (2,204 m)
- Time zone: UTC-6 (Mountain Standard Time)
- Zip code: 80908
- Area code: 719

La Foret is an unincorporated populated place in El Paso County. It is located near Shoup Road and Colorado State Highway 83 towards Interstate 25. Residents of La Foret generally work and shop in nearby Colorado Springs or Black Forest. Activities in La Foret are primarily centered on the presence of the La Foret Conference and Retreat Center which is located there. The famous Ponderosa Lodge that was built in 1928 by Jacques Benedict and appears on the U.S. National Register of Historic Places and the Colorado State Register of Historic Properties is located in La Foret and is now part of the La Foret Conference and Retreat Center.

== History ==
The History of La Foret is very similar to that of the nearby Black Forest and the larger region along the Palmer Divide area traditionally known as "The Pineries". La Foret was first settled in the 1850s and was predominantly a lumber mill community. As the amount of lumber milling began to decline in the La Foret area around the 1880s ranching became the predominant industry in La Foret, however lumbering continued sporadically up until the 1950s. Today, La Foret acts predominantly as a somewhat rural suburb for nearby Colorado Springs and the Denver Metropolitan Area.
