= Weber-Wahsatch Historic District =

Neighborhood of Colorado Springs, Colorado, USA

- North Weber Street-Wahsatch Avenue Historic Residential District
- U.S. National Register of Historic Places
- Location within Colorado
- Location: N. Weber St. between Boulder and Del Norte St., and N. Wahsatch Ave. between St. Vrain and Columbia St., Colorado Springs, Colorado
- Coordinates: 38.83738°N 104.82244°W
- Area: 128.6 acres (52.0 ha)
- Built: 1880
- Built by: Multiple
- Architect: Multiple
- Architectural style: Bungalow/Craftsman, Late Victorian, Classic Cottage
- Website: historicuptown.org
- NRHP reference No.: 85000205
- Added to NRHP: February 8, 1985

The Weber-Wahsatch Historic District is a residential neighborhood located in Colorado Springs, Colorado. The district was added to the National Register of Historic Places in 1985. The majority of the buildings in the district were constructed during the mining boom of the late 19th century.

== Geographic boundaries ==
The Historic District lies within the boundaries of Cache La Poudre Street to the north, Cheyenne Avenue to the south, and the alleys behind Wahsatch Avenue and Weber Street to the east and west, respectively. These boundaries include the Historic Uptown neighborhood, a central section of the district.
