= Naulakha (Rudyard Kipling House) =

Historic Shingle Style house in Dummerston, Vermont, United States

- U.S. National Register of Historic Places
- U.S. National Historic Landmark
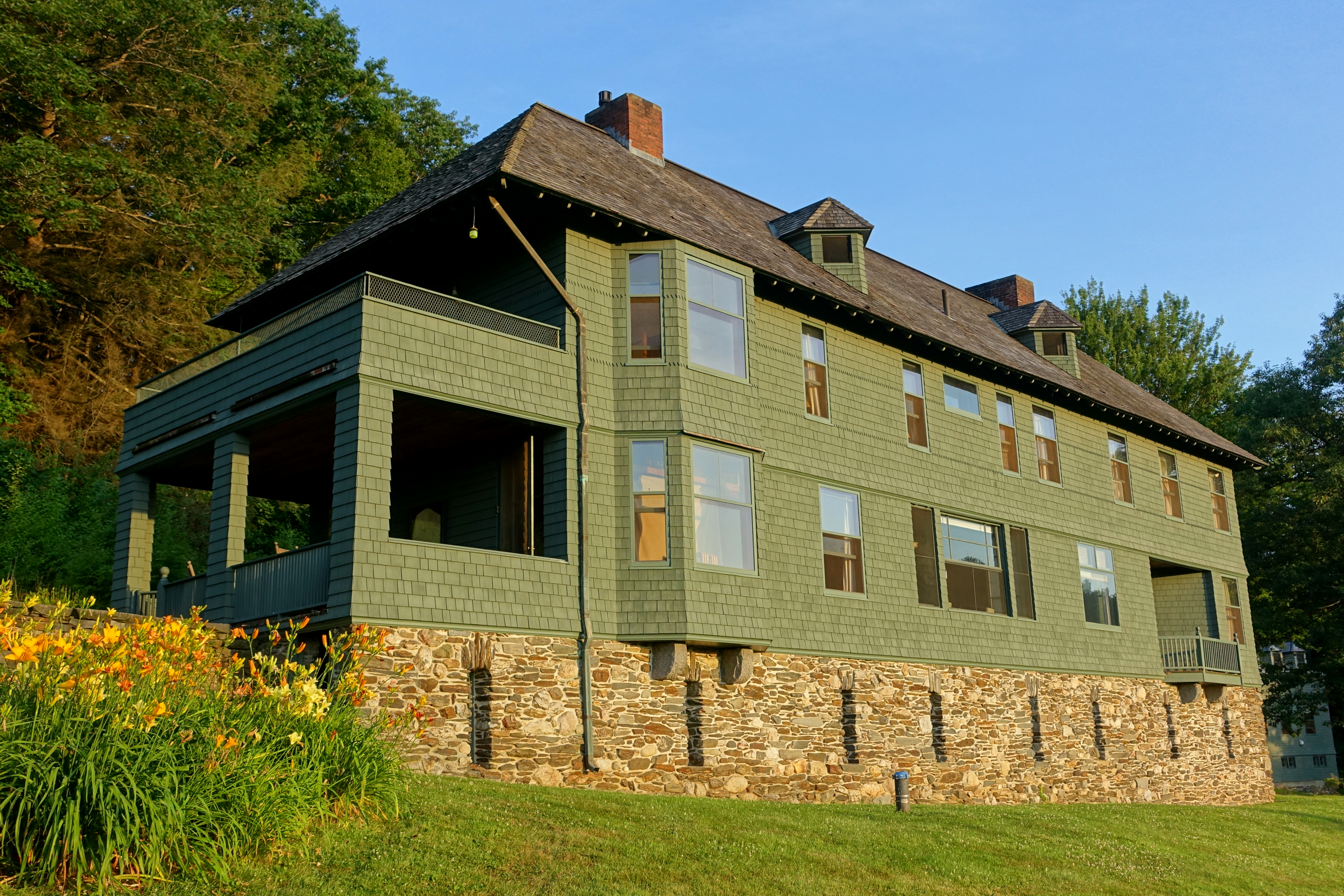
- Naulakha in 2014

- Location within Vermont Location within the United States
- Location: Off U.S. 5, Dummerston, Vermont
- Coordinates: 42°53′55″N 72°33′51″W
- Area: 11 acres (4.5 ha)
- Built: 1892
- Architect: Henry Rutgers Marshall
- Architectural style: Shingle Style
- NRHP reference No.: 79000231

Significant dates
- Added to NRHP: April 11, 1979
- Designated NHL: November 4, 1993

Naulakha, also known as the Rudyard Kipling House, is a historic Shingle Style house on Kipling Road in Dummerston, Vermont, a few miles outside Brattleboro. The house was designated a National Historic Landmark in 1993 for its association with the author Rudyard Kipling (1865–1936), who had it built in 1893 and made it his home until 1896. It is in this house that Kipling wrote Captains Courageous, The Jungle Book, The Day's Work, and The Seven Seas, and did work on Kim and The Just So Stories. Kipling named the house after the Naulakha Pavilion, situated inside Lahore Fort in present-day Pakistan. The house is now owned by the Landmark Trust, and is available for rent.

== Name ==
"Kipling named Naulakha after the book he wrote with Wolcott Balestier, his good friend and Mrs. Kipling's brother, about a precious Indian jewel, and it is filled with a trove of their possessions." Etymologically Naulakha means nine lakhs or nine hundred thousand being the amount of rupees incurred for the cost of construction of the building. The Mughal architecture of the monument had inspired him during his earlier stay (between 1882 and 1887) in Lahore.

== Description ==
Kipling himself described the building and its construction in his autobiography, Something of Myself:

[In the summer of 1893] there came out of Quebec Jean Pigeon with nine other habitants who put up a wooden shed for their own accommodation in what seemed twenty minutes, and then set to work to build us a house which we called 'Naulakha.' Ninety feet was the length of it and thirty the width, on a high foundation of solid mortared rocks which gave us an airy and a skunk-proof basement. The rest was wood, shingled, roof and sides, with dull green hand-split shingles, and the windows were lavish and wide. Lavish too was the long open attic, as I realised when too late. Pigeon asked me whether I would have it finished in ash or cherry. Ignorant that I was, I chose ash, and so missed a stretch of perhaps the most satisfying interior wood that is grown. Those were opulent days, when timber was nothing regarded, and the best of cabinet-work could be had for little money.

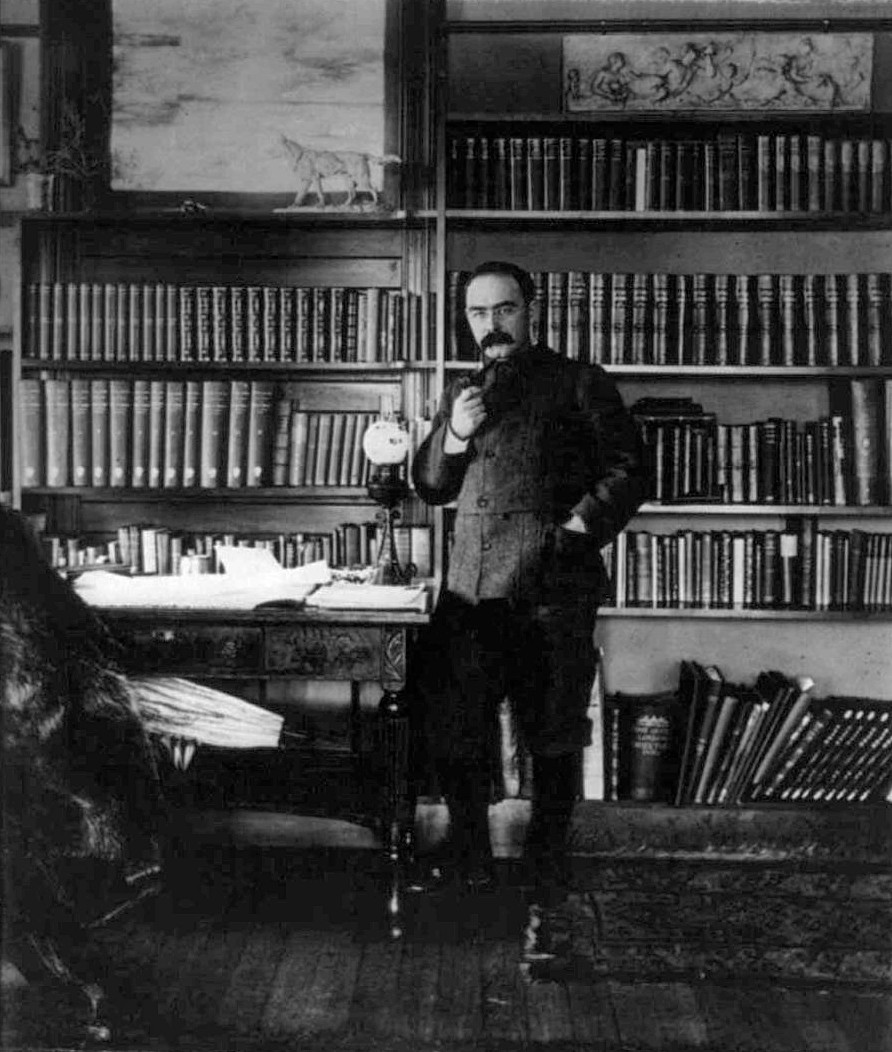
Kipling in his study at Naulakha, 1895

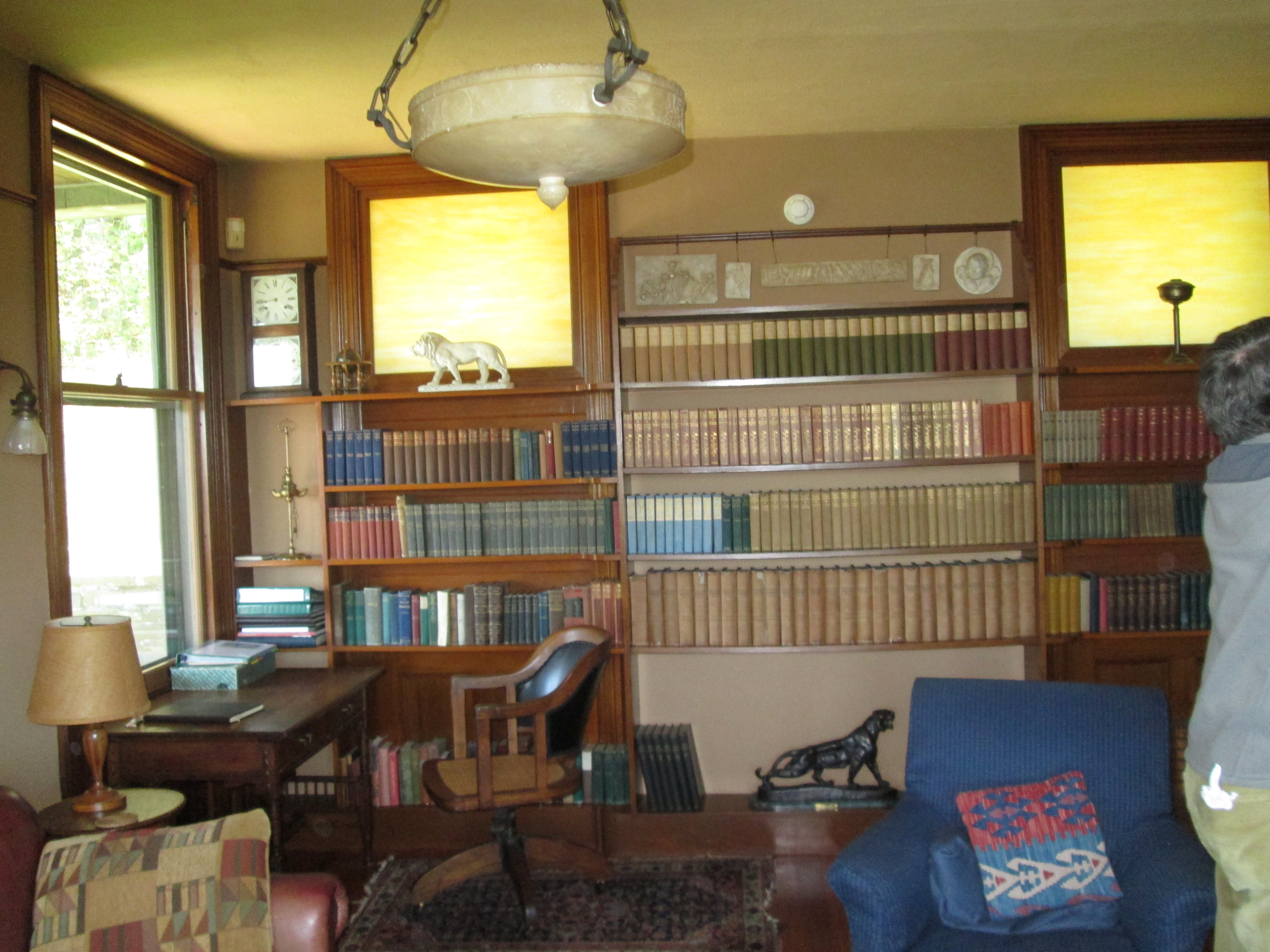
The house contains this library of Kipling's works, some of which were owned by him when he lived here

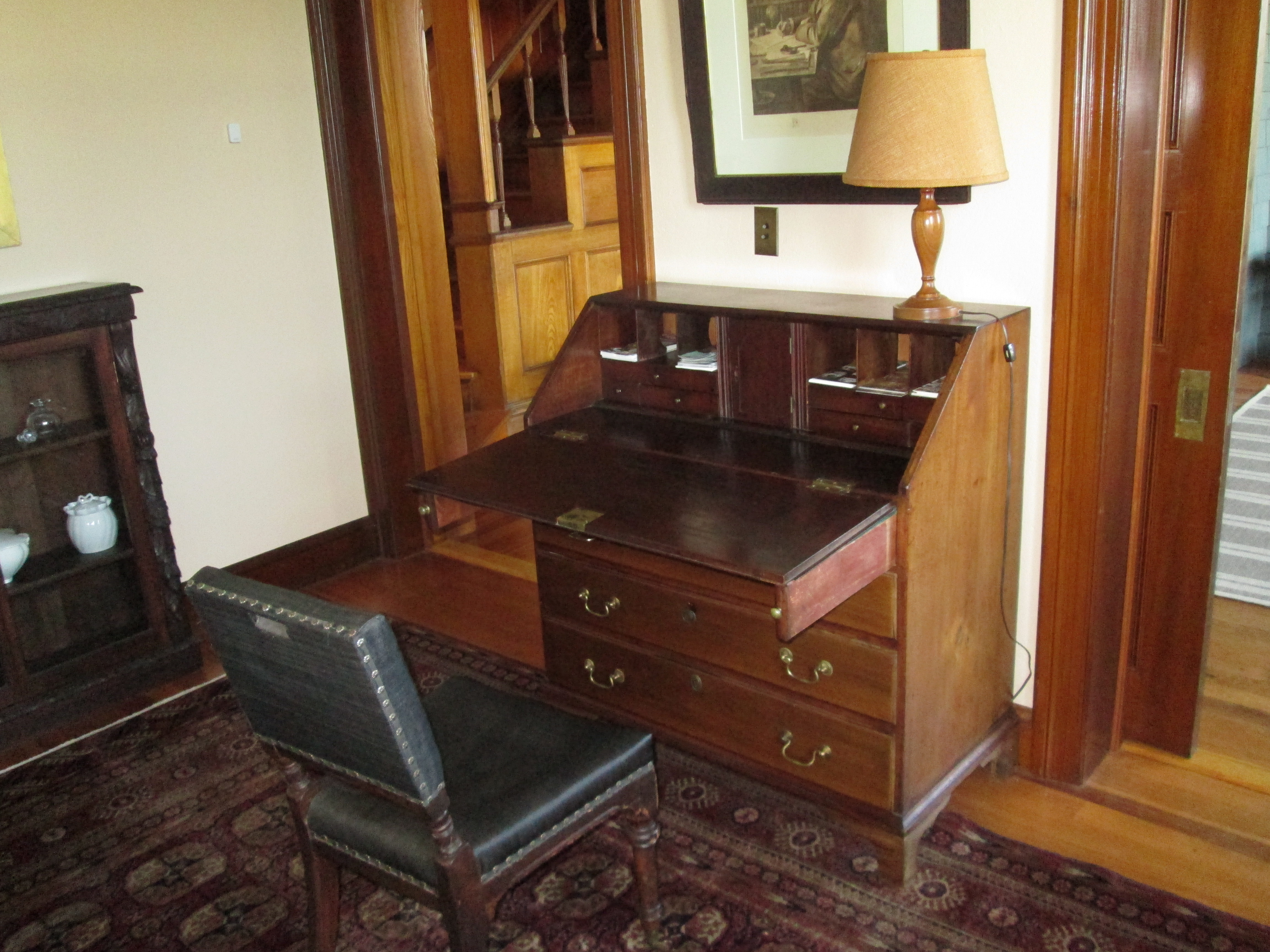
It also contains this original desk, at which he is said to have written The Jungle Book and other works mentioned in the article

Stylistically the house is an architecturally cross-cultural and distinctive building, resembling in part a South Asian Indian bungalow, albeit executed in the then-fashionable American Shingle style. The property and house were laid out by Kipling to maximize the family's privacy. Although it has extensive views to the Connecticut River and Mount Monadnock to the east, the house as built had only a single entrance and was only one room deep, with a hallway running along the rear. The house is approached by a tree-lined drive from an iron gate set between fieldstone pillars whose construction Kipling watched. The property includes a number of outbuildings and facilities built by the Kiplings, including a greenhouse, carriage barn, and tennis court.

The Kiplings, while on their honeymoon in 1892, visited Caroline Starr Balestier Kipling's parents in nearby Brattleboro. Taken by the countryside, the couple purchased this property from Caroline's brother, and had the house built on it in 1893 to a design by Henry Rutgers Marshall, with significant input from Kipling. In 1894, Arthur Conan Doyle visited Kipling at Naulakha, where the two played golf together. The Kiplings lived here until 1896, when a dispute with a hot-tempered neighbor (his brother-in-law Beatty Balestier) led to court proceedings and an avalanche of unwelcome publicity. The Kiplings attempted to return in 1899, but illness on the sea crossing from England frustrated the plan. The property was owned for much of the 20th century by members of the Holbrook family, who in 1992 sold it to the Landmark Trust, a preservation organization that restores historic properties and makes them available to the public. The property has largely been restored to its appearance as of the Kiplings’ ownership, and includes artifacts belonging to the family.

The house was listed on the National Register of Historic Places in 1979, and was declared a National Historic Landmark in 1993.

== See also ==
- List of National Historic Landmarks in Vermont
- National Register of Historic Places listings in Windham County, Vermont
