= Judson Moss Bemis House =

Historic house in Colorado, US

- U.S. National Register of Historic Places
- Colorado State Register of Historic Properties No. 5EP.196
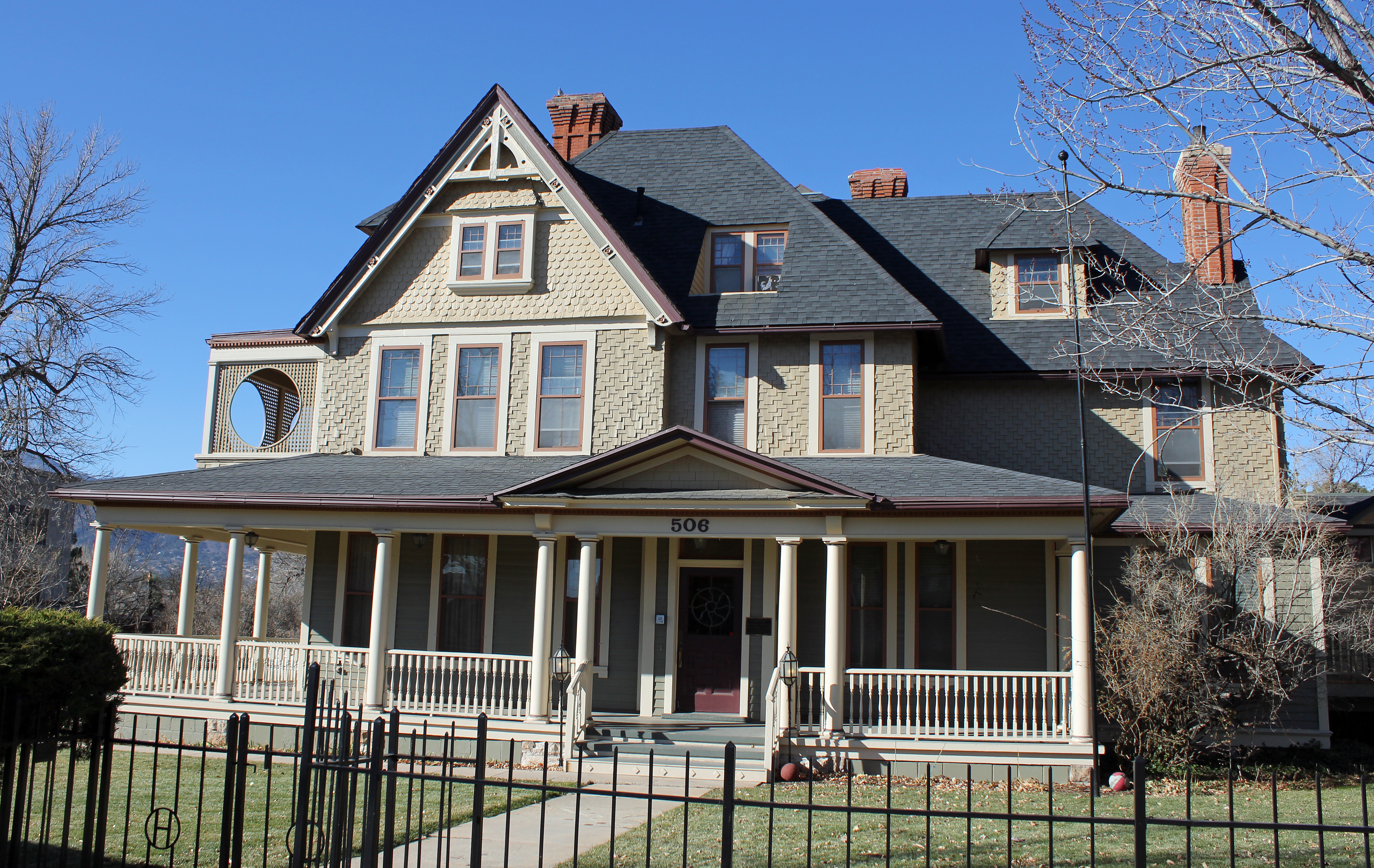
- Judson Moss Bemis House

- Location within Colorado Location within the United States
- Location: 506 N. Cascade Avenue, Colorado Springs, Colorado
- Coordinates: 38°50′28.56″N 104°49′31.05″W
- Built: 1885
- Architect: Joseph Dozier, W. F. Ellis
- Architectural style: Colonial Revival, Queen Anne, Stick/Eastlake
- NRHP reference No.: 79000598
- CSRHP No.: 5EP.196

Significant dates
- Added to NRHP: 1979
- Designated CSRHP: 1979

Judson Moss Bemis House, also known as Hearthstone Inn, is a historic Queen Anne house in Colorado Springs, Colorado. It is listed in the National Register of Historic Places.

== Judson Moss Bemis family ==
Judson Moss Bemis and his wife, Alice Cogswell Bemis, moved to Colorado Springs in 1881 for her health. She may have had tuberculosis. (See Tuberculosis treatment in Colorado Springs).

The house was built in 1885 and became the permanent home of Alice Bemis and their daughter, Alice; Judson Moss Bemis lived in the home several months a year and conducted business and lived the rest of the year in Boston. He was the founder of J. M. Bemis Company.

In Colorado Springs, Bemis founded the Business Administration and Banking School, was a trustee of Colorado College and donated monies for the Jackson and Bemis Halls. Alice Cogswell Bemis founded the Day Care Center in 1897. The couple's daughter, Alice Bemis Taylor, donated monies to Colorado College, helped fund the construction of the Colorado Springs Fine Arts Center and the Colorado Springs Day Nursery, and provided scholarships. She was the first woman trustee of Colorado College, founded the Bemis-Taylor Child Guidance Clinic, and in 2010 was inducted into the Colorado Women's Hall of Fame.

== The house ==
The Bemis House, designed by W. F. Ellis, is a blend of architectural styles, including Queen Anne, Colonial Revival and Stick architectural styles. The three-story home originally had 10 rooms and a partial basement, and received additions in 1886 and 1887. In 1935, the home was converted into an apartment house with 10 apartments based upon designs by architects MacLaren and Thomas.

== Hearthstone Inn ==
Dot Williams and Ruth Williams purchased the Bemis House and the neighboring historic home to create Hearthstone Inn. The second house was built in 1900. For a period of time it was a boarding house for individuals with tuberculosis. The buildings were restored and renovated as an inn with a restaurant and 25 rooms. The architects for the project were Al Feinstein of Colorado Springs and William Odum of Dallas. The inn and its antiques were purchased by David and Nancy Oxenhandler in 1999 for $1,925,000. In 2005 it was sold to Griffis/ Blessing Investment Services.
