= Taylor Memorial Chapel =

- U.S. National Register of Historic Places
- Colorado State Register of Historic Properties No. 5EP.1297
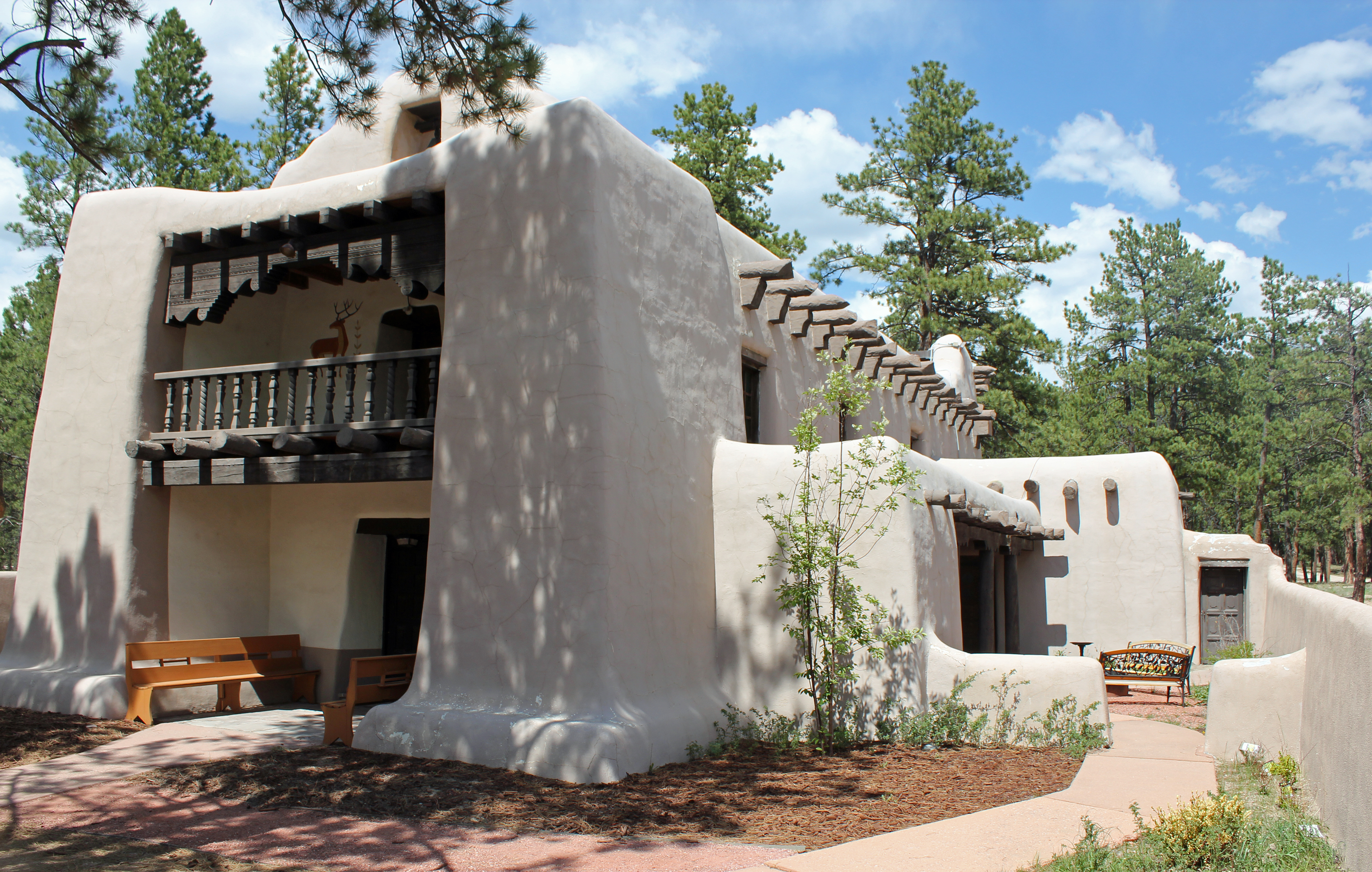

- Location within Colorado Location within the United States
- Location: 6145 Shoup, Black Forest, Colorado
- Coordinates: 39°0′24″N 104°43′7″W
- Built: 1929
- Architect: John Gaw Meem
- Architectural style: Pueblo
- NRHP reference No.: 99000447
- CSRHP No.: 5EP.1297

Significant dates
- Added to NRHP: April 15, 1999
- Designated CSRHP: April 15, 1999

Taylor Memorial Chapel at La Foret Conference and Retreat Center is a historic chapel in Black Forest, Colorado. It is a National Register of Historic Places listing.

== History ==
The chapel was built in 1929 as a memorial to Alice Bemis Taylor's husband, Frederick Morgan Pike Taylor. Designed by John Gaw Meem on the property of Taylor's summer home, La Foret, it was her private place of worship until 1942 when she died. It was donated to the United Church of Christ's Rocky Mountain Conference in 1944. The chapel's interior and exterior were restored using a State Historic Fund grant of $120,000.

== Description ==
It is historically significant because it is a John Gaw Meem (Note: Meem married Alice Bemis Taylor's niece, Faith Bemis, who, like her husband, was an architect. He designed the Colorado Springs Fine Arts Center, constructed as the result of funding by Alice Bemis Taylor and containing collections that she donated.) "Santa Fe Style" church building, built north of the San Luis Valley. The pueblo chapel is surrounded by a walled courtyard near a ravine in the Ponderosa pine forest. It appears much as it had when originally built with stuccoed walls, log vigas, a bell from "an old mission church in New Mexico". The two-storied building is entered through double carved wooden doors. It has an altar and north and south transepts, each with side porches. Inside the church are a number of wood carvings features. Eugenie Shonnard carved 20-foot reredos of seven saints. Archways to the transepts "rough hewn wood carvings". The altar, pulpit, lectern, and other furnishings are made of carved wood, also by Shonnard. Above the log vigas is a herringbone pattern made of Aspen saplings. Flagstone is used for flooring. A spiral staircase is used to access the second story where there is additional seating.

Bainbridge Bunting wrote in his book, ‘’John Gaw Meem: Southwestern Architect:’’

The Taylor chapel, Meem’s first essay in the traditional church form, was commissioned in 1928 by Mrs. Alice B. Taylor. As in his early Spanish-Pueblo houses, the forms here ten to be more picturesque, the batter of the walls is exaggerated, and the profiles of the parapets self-consciously irregular. The woodwork is also elaborately carved, much more so than any that survives in a mission church. This is especially true of two interior doors leading to the “transepts.” These and the reredos were carved by Meem’s friend Eugenie Shonnard...

It reflects Taylor's values of piety and simplicity, "passion for Southwestern art", and with an "unparalleled view" of Pikes Peak.

== La Foret ==
The chapel is one of two historic properties located in the La Foret Conference and Retreat Center. The Ponderosa Lodge is also on the National Register of Historic Places. The center is located on 400 acres of meadows and Ponderosa pines.

The center had originally been a 500-acre summer estate of Alice Bemis Taylor, a philanthropist and an important Colorado Springs family. Mrs. Taylor held artist-in-residence programs on the estate she called La Foret. The Taylor Memorial Chapel was built one year after the lodge as a memorial to her husband, Frederick Morgan Pike Taylor. Alice Taylor died in 1942 and the property was deeded to the Colorado Congregational Church by the Bemis Taylor Foundation. The center is now open to United Church of Christ members, other denominations and organizations. La Foret now has a number of cabins, a dining hall, sports fields and courts, and outdoor theater seating.

== Black Forest fire ==
Taylor Memorial Chapel and other buildings at La Foret Conference and Retreat Center were spared from the Black Forest fire (June, 2013), at least partly due to mitigation efforts.

The retreat center created the "Black Forest Strong" organization to serve as a resource to the recuperating Black Forest community. The seven point plan includes grief counseling, serving as a community resource center, providing aid to victims and organizing events. In addition, the plan includes preservation, reseeding efforts, and mitigation training and services.
