= Eugenie Shonnard =

American sculptor and painter

Eugenie F. Shonnard
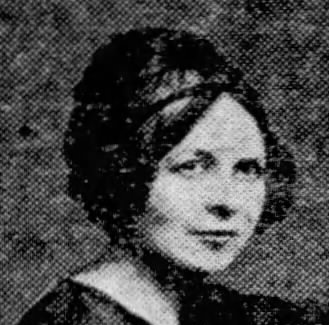
- Born: April 29, 1886; Yonkers, New York
- Died: April 5, 1978 (aged 91); Santa Fe, New Mexico
- Education: Alphonse Mucha, Auguste Rodin
- Known for: Sculpture
- Spouse: Edward Gordon Ludlam (1875-1955)
- Patrons: Edgar Lee Hewett

Eugenie Frederica Shonnard (1886–1978) was an American sculptor and painter.

== New York and Paris ==
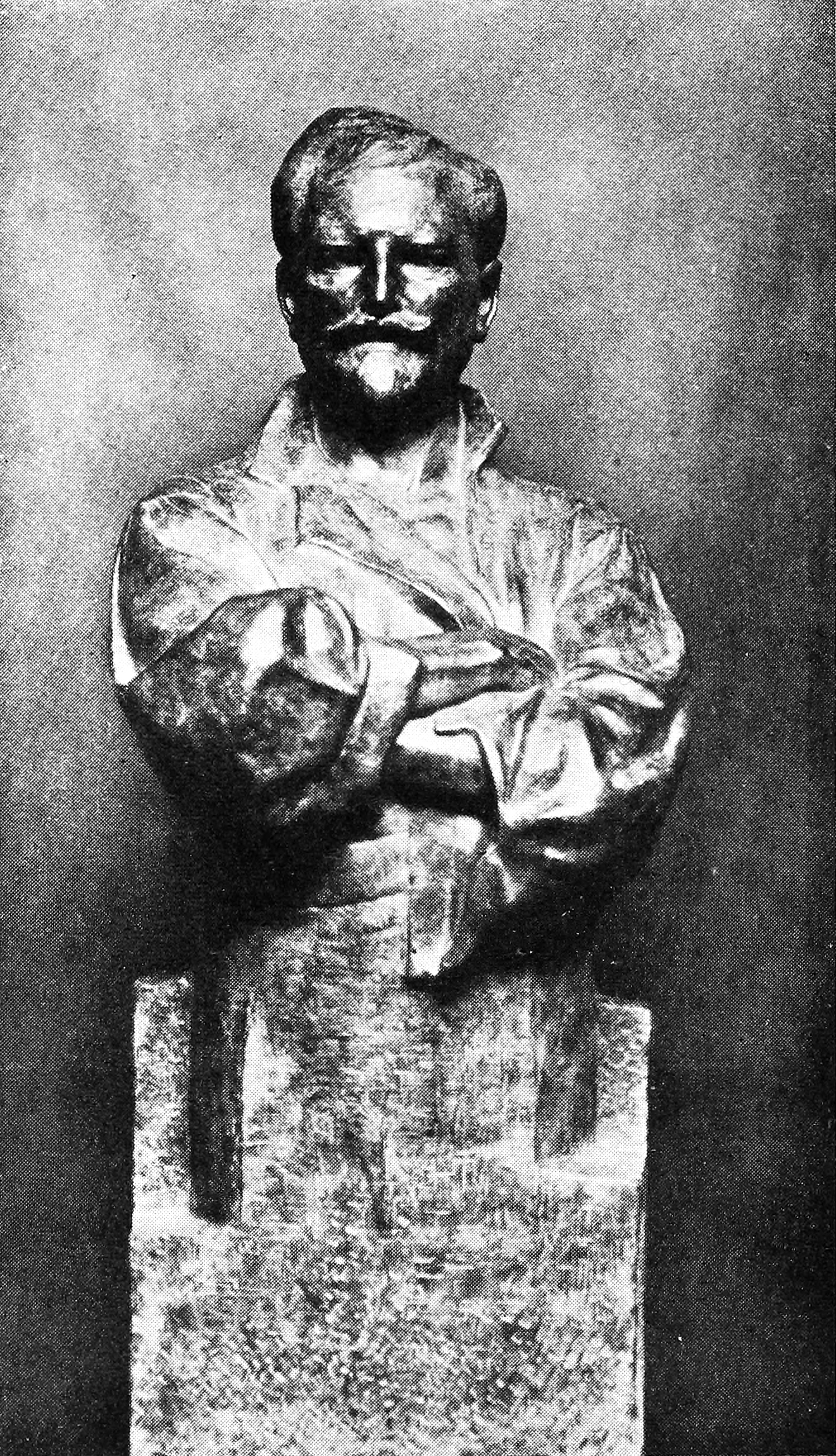
Bust of Alphonse Mucha (1907)

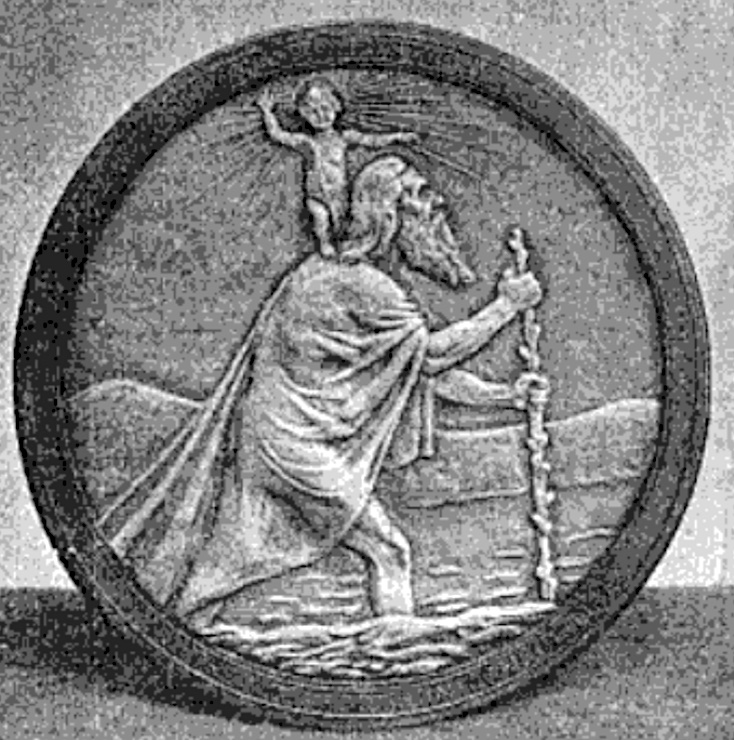
Saint Christopher Medal (1915)

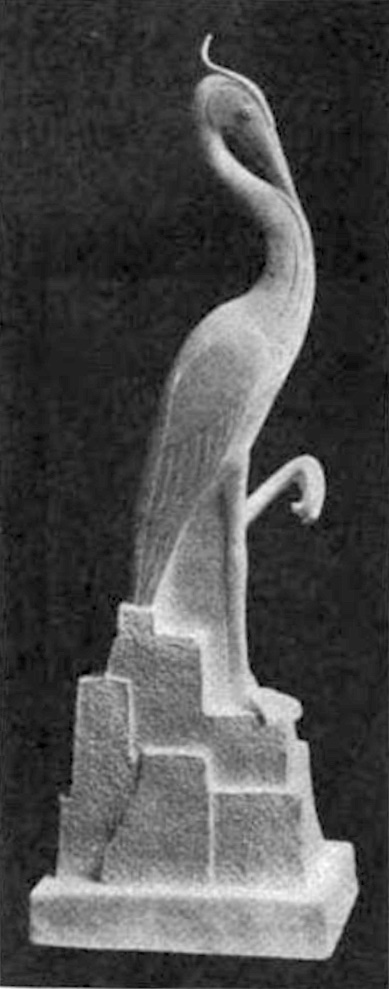
The Crane (1920)

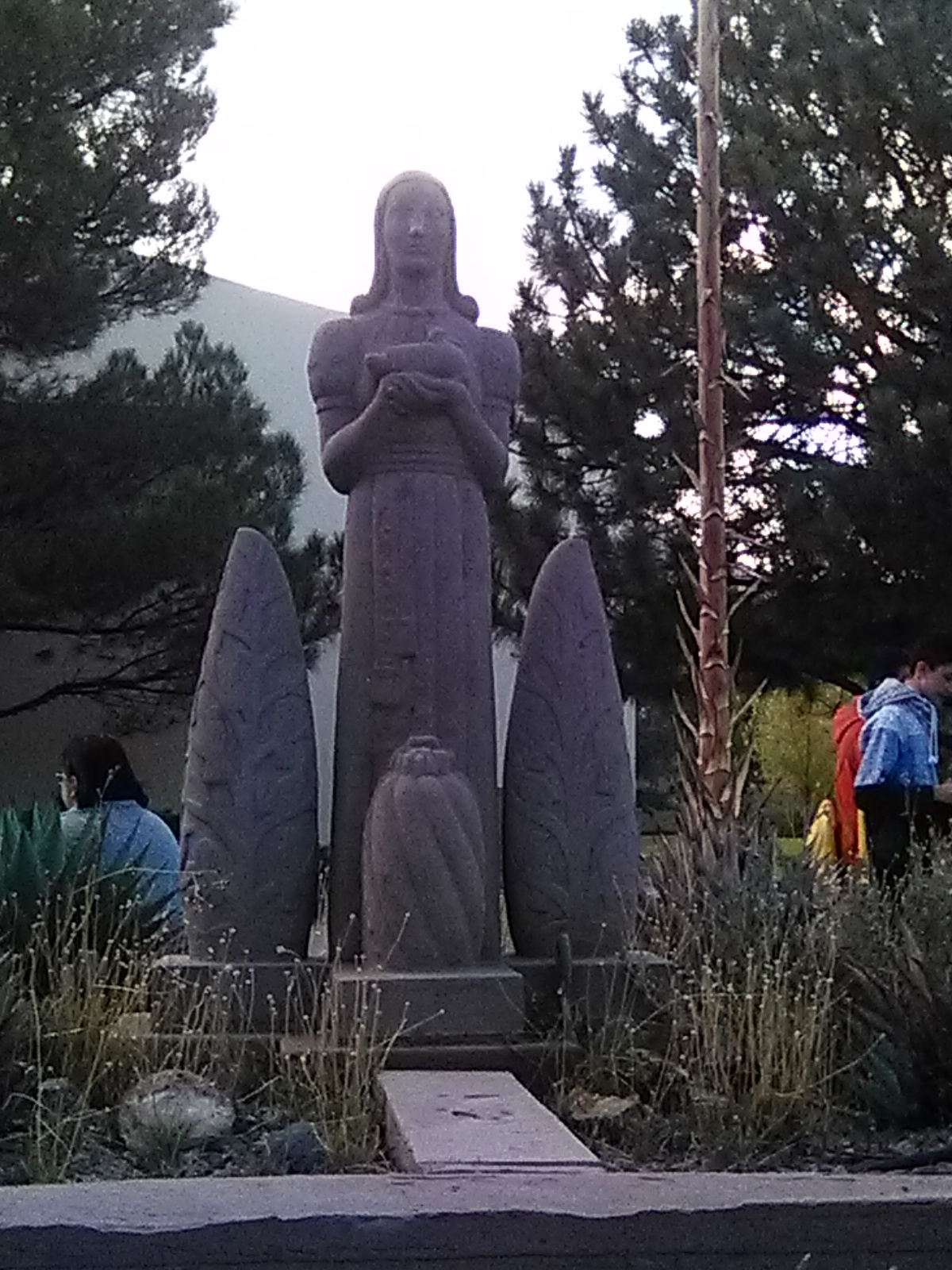
Maiden of the Desert (1941)

Shonnard was 20 years old when she began her formal art studies in New York at the New York School of Applied Design for Women. She studied with Alphonse Mucha and eventually at the Art Students League with James Earle Fraser. After the death of her father in 1911, she and her mother moved to Paris where Shonnard was mentored by sculptors Antoine Bourdelle and Auguste Rodin, two of the most important artists of the late nineteenth and early twentieth century. Until WWI forced her back to New York, she exhibited in both cities, including at the Société Nationale des Beaux Artes, American Women Artists Association (Paris), National Academy of Design (New York), Brooklyn Museum of Art, and the Metropolitan Museum of Art. Among notable early sculptures are a bust of her teacher Alphonse Mucha (1907) and a bronze bust entitled "My Friend," of Dinah, the Bronx Zoo's first gorilla, which was gifted to the New York Zoological Society and unveiled by its Ladies’ Auxiliary in May 1915.

After the war, Shonnard and her mother sailed back to France in 1920. As an American modernist in the small field of young sculptors in Paris, Shonnard "found favor among the elect." Her work was featured in several Parisian salons, and a 1926 solo show at Galerie Allard won her wide praise in France and in the United States. The sixty pieces in the Allard show included her usual sculptures of animals but also landscape paintings and busts of "Red Indians" from time spent in Arizona and New Mexico. The French magazine, L'Arte et les Artistes, extolled: "Serenity is one of the marked fundamentals of Miss Shonnard's work. . .full of spirituality, grandeur, and love of the ideal. Sculpture becomes for her an illustration of parables written by the Divine on the plummage of the birds and in the eye of gazelles." During her years in France, Shonnard also lived and worked in Brittany sculpting Breton peasants. Railroad magnate George Dupont Pratt donated one of her Breton bronzes to the Metropolitan Museum of Art.

== Santa Fe ==
In 1925 Shonnard spent the summer in Santa Fe, New Mexico, where she had been offered free studio space by Edgar Lee Hewett, founder and director of the School of American Research and the brand new Museum of New Mexico. Working in the American west, Shonnard was excited by visits to local Pueblos and sculpting indigenous figures in marble. In Paris these sculptures of Native American people won her even more acclaim, particularly in her solo show at Galerie Allard. But in 1927 Shonnard and her mother left Europe and settled permanently in Santa Fe, possibly because of financial concerns. Her father’s death in 1911 had left the family in straitened circumstances. By one account, Frederic Shonnard, a pillar of Yonkers society, had lost a real estate fortune estimated to be as much as two million dollars due to risky ventures and tax debt. In 1927 the city of Yonkers imposed liens on Shonnard properties and eventually auctioned them off for non-payment of taxes, publicly naming Eugenie, her mother, and brothers as scofflaws. In Santa Fe, Shonnard and her mother could live cheaply and free from scandal in a faraway place that welcomed them on the basis of Shonnard’s artistic reputation. Shonnard would live and work in Santa Fe the rest of her life.

While in New Mexico she became well respected for her carvings of Pueblo Indians. She traveled to the Pueblos and learned how they make pottery with Maximiliana, the sister of famous San Ildefonso potter, Maria Martinez. Shonnard's Pueblo Indian with Bowl sculpture was unanimously chosen to represent New Mexico in the 1938 exhibition of sculpture at the Architectural League in New York. She had solo exhibitions at the New Mexico Museum of Art in 1928, 1937, 1954, and 2025 and at the Roswell Museum and Art Center in 1969. In May 1954 she was awarded an honorary fellowship in fine arts by the School of American Research and Museum of New Mexico.

Shonnard was an early proponent of the "direct carving" style of creating sculpture. She developed a cement material she called Keenstone which she used for both sculptural and architectural work.

Shonnard was a member of the National Association of Women Artists and the National Sculpture Society and exhibited at their 1923 and 1929 exhibitions. In 1939 she created wood panels—Indians and Cattle—for the U.S. Court House and Post Office in Waco, Texas, through the New Deal Section of Painting and Sculpture.

== Personal life ==
Shonnard was born in Yonkers, New York. She was the daughter of Civil War Major Frederic Shonnard of the 6th New York Heavy Artillery Regiment, and Eugenie Smyth Shonnard, a descendant of Declaration of Independence signatory Francis Lewis.

On July 26, 1933 Eugenie Shonnard married Edward Gordon Ludlam in her mother's Santa Fe home. She was 47, Ludlam was 58. Concerned that marriage would interfere with her daughter's career, Mrs. Shonnard was not in favor of the union, which by published accounts and in the artist's own words, turned out to be a happy and productive one. Ludlam had moved to Santa Fe in 1925, about the time of Shonnard's first visit, and was known as a man-about-town and alternately as a Boston financier or Colorado "mining and oil man." Supportive of his wife's career, Ludlam helped with the invention of her sculpting material, Keenstone, and at times with the work of making sculpture and furniture. (In the 1940 census, his occupation is reported as "Asst Sculptor.") Together, they created the gardens at their home on Hickox Street. Gordan Ludlam died in 1955.

Shonnard was an active part of the vibrant pre-war and mid-20th century Santa Fe art community. Her contemporaries and friends included Olive Rush, Randall Davey, Jozef Bakos, Laura Gilpin, John Gaw Meem, Gustave Baumann, and Witter Bynner. She continued to work in the Santa Fe studio built by her husband until the end of her life. The Shonnard-Ludlam Residence is now home to the offices of the Museum of New Mexico Foundation.

== Collections ==
Photos referencing Shonnard's life and work may be found in the University of New Mexico Digital Collection and the New Mexico History Museum digital collection. A partial list of works follows.

- France
    - Marabout, 1923, (granite) Jardin des Plantes, Museum of Natural History, Paris
    - Lapin aux oreilles couchées, 1923 Musée National d'Art Moderne, Centre Georges-Pompidou, Paris
    - Marabou; Group of Herons; Le Chat; and Rabbit, Luxembourg Museum, Paris
    - Bust de Femme, 1924, (stone). Private ownership.
- United States
  - Colorado
    - Reredos of Seven Saints, 1929 (Carved wood.) Taylor Memorial Chapel, La Foret Conference and Retreat Center, Colorado Springs
    - Colorado Springs Fine Arts Center, Colorado Springs
  - New Mexico
    - Reredos for "La Conquistadora," 1961 (Keenstone), Rosario Chapel, Rosario Cemetery, Santa Fe
    - New Mexico Museum of Art, Santa Fe
    - Virgin Mary, c. 1962 (carved stone), Immaculate Heart of Mary Seminary, Chapel, Santa Fe
    - St Joseph, 1962, Sacred Heart of Mary Chapel, Santa Fe
    - Youth in the Desert, 1941, Sandia School, Albuquerque.
    - Maiden of the Desert 1941, (sandstone) New Mexico Institute of Mining and Technology, Socorro
    - The Turtle Pond, 1939, (concrete and tile), New Mexico Veterans Center, Truth or Consequences NM
    - De Vargas Monument, 1973 (pigmented concrete), outdoor sculpture administered by Los Caballeros and the Hilton Hotel, 100 Sandoval Street, Santa Fe.
    - Justice Howard L Bickley, 1948, (bronze plaque), State Supreme Court Building, Santa Fe.
  - New York
    - His Majesty The Heron and Head of a Breton Peasant, 1925, (bronze) Metropolitan Museum of Art
    - Pueblo Indian Woman, (sandstone), permanent collection, IBM, Armonk
    - Hudson River Museum, Yonkers
  - Ohio
    - Two Geese, Cleveland Museum of Art, Cleveland
  - South Carolina
    - Co-Co, 1924, (bronze), Brookgreen Gardens, Murrells Inlet
    - Marabou, 1915,(marble), Brookgreen Gardens, Murrells Inlet
    - Co-Co (2), 1924, (bronze), Brookgreen Gardens, Murrells Inlet
  - Texas
    - Cattle; Indians (Two 4x6 ft low-relief panels, Texas gumwood), 1939. Federal Building, 800 Franklin St, Waco
    - Panhandle-Plains Historical Museum, Canyon
