= Ponderosa Lodge =

- U.S. National Register of Historic Places
- Colorado State Register of Historic Properties No. 5EP.5887
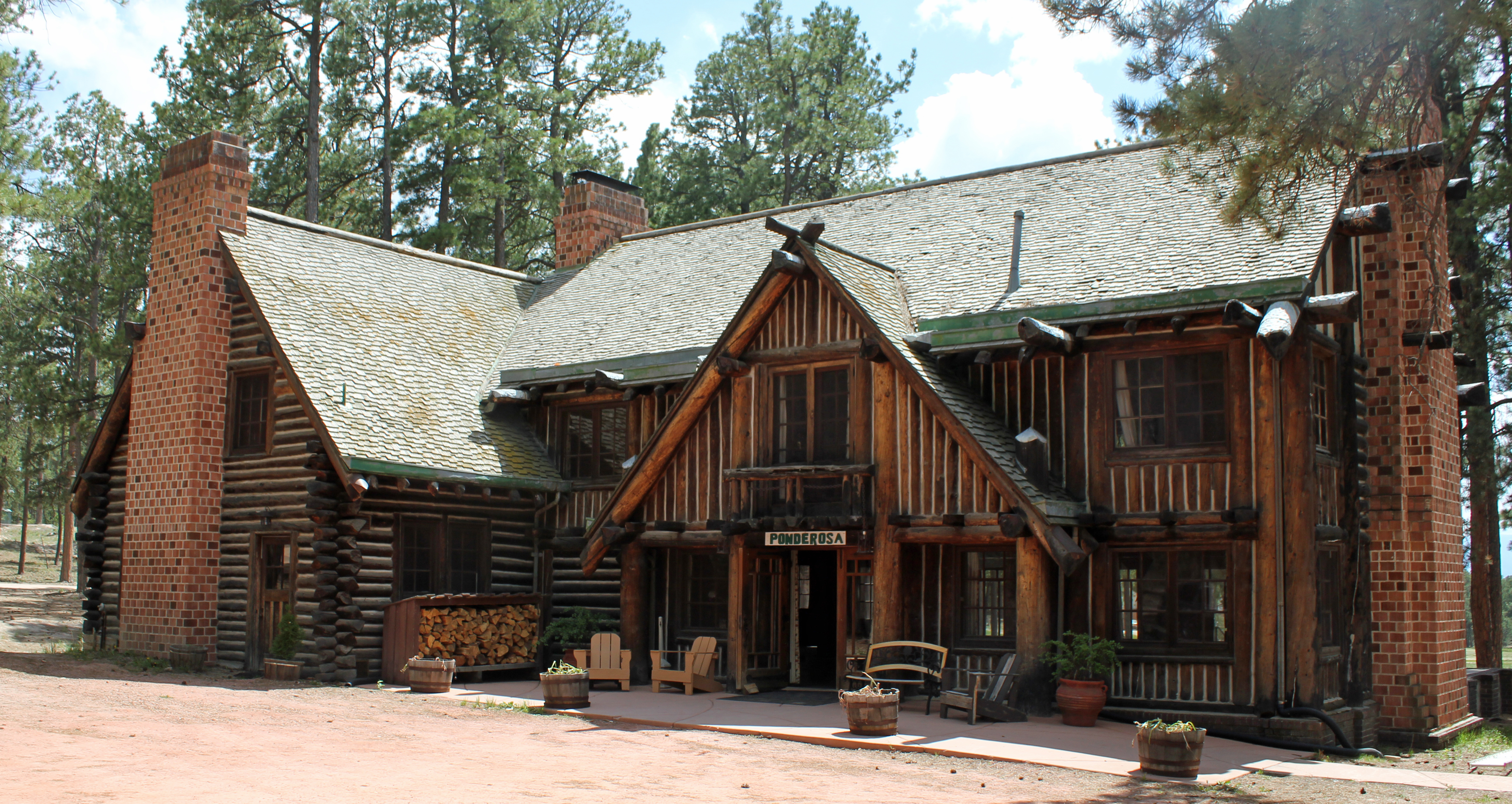

- Location within Colorado Location within the United States
- Location: 6145 Shoup, La Foret, Colorado
- Coordinates: 39°0′33″N 104°43′0″W
- Built: 1928
- Architect: Jules Jacques Benois Benedict
- Architectural style: Colorado Alpine, Rustic
- NRHP reference No.: 08000829
- CSRHP No.: 5EP.5887

Significant dates
- Added to NRHP: 2008
- Designated CSRHP: August 29, 2008

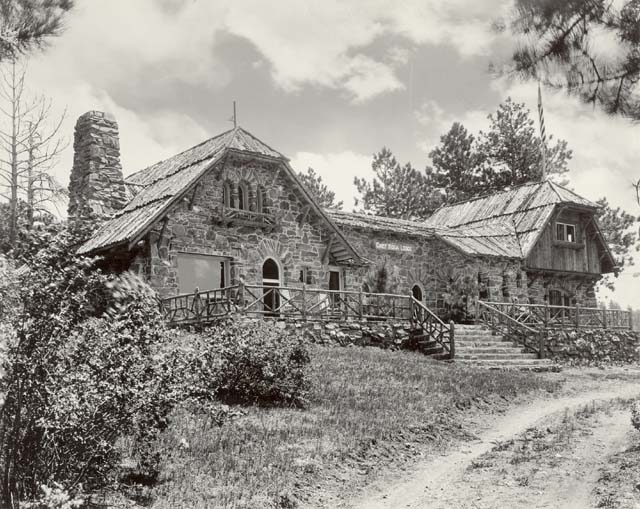
Chief Hosa Lodge, built 1918, and designed by Jacques Benedict, is similar to Ponderosa Lodge, both having "a pitched roof, timber gable supports, exposed log beams, and massive fireplaces."

Ponderosa Lodge at La Foret Conference and Retreat Center is a historic lodge in Black Forest, Colorado. It is a National Register of Historic Places listing and is on the Colorado State Register of Historic Properties.

== History ==
The lodge was built in 1928 as Alice Bemis Taylor's summer retreat.

Designed by Jules Jacques Benoit Benedict, the summer home was similar to other mountain homes that he designed, using "native construction material", including ponderosa pine from Pikes Peak's western slope, and displaying "the finest craftsmanship." One of Benedict's signature elements is the grand staircase in the main hall. He also designed an "elaborate fireplace", with custom iron work. Ponderosa Lodge is one of the properties submitted as multiple submission of Benedict's work for the Colorado Register of Historic Properties.

== La Foret ==
Ponderosa Lodge is one of two historic properties located in the La Foret Conference and Retreat Center. The Taylor Memorial Chapel is also on the National Register of Historic Places. The center is located on 400 acres of meadows and Ponderosa pines.

The center had originally been a 500-acre summer estate of Alice Bemis Taylor, a philanthropist and an important Colorado Springs family. Mrs. Taylor held artist-in-residence programs on the estate she called La Foret. The Taylor Memorial Chapel was built one year after the lodge as a memorial to her husband, Frederick Morgan Pike Taylor. Alice Taylor died in 1942 and the property was deeded to the Colorado Congregational Church by the Bemis Taylor Foundation. The center is now open to United Church of Christ members, other denominations and organizations. La Foret now has a number of cabins, a dining hall, sports fields and courts, and outdoor theater seating.

== Black Forest fire ==
Ponderosa Lodge and other buildings at La Foret Conference and Retreat Center were spared from the Black Forest fire (June, 2013), at least partly due to mitigation efforts.

The retreat center created the "Black Forest Strong" organization to serve as a resource to the recuperating Black Forest community. The seven point plan includes grief counseling, serving as a community resource center, providing aid to victims and organizing events. In addition, the plan includes preservation, reseeding efforts, and mitigation training and services.
