= Alice Bemis Taylor =

American philanthropist (1877–1942)

Alice Bemis Taylor (October 15, 1877 – June 22, 1942) was a philanthropist and was inducted into the Colorado Women's Hall of Fame in 2010.

For her significant contributions to Colorado College, Colorado Springs Fine Arts Center and the Colorado Springs Day Nursery and other organizations, she was named "Lady Bountiful" by the press.

== Early years ==
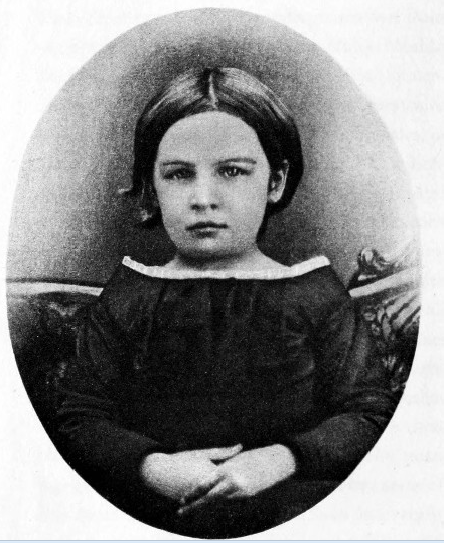
Alice Cogswell (later Alice Cogswell Bemis), mother of Alice Bemis Taylor

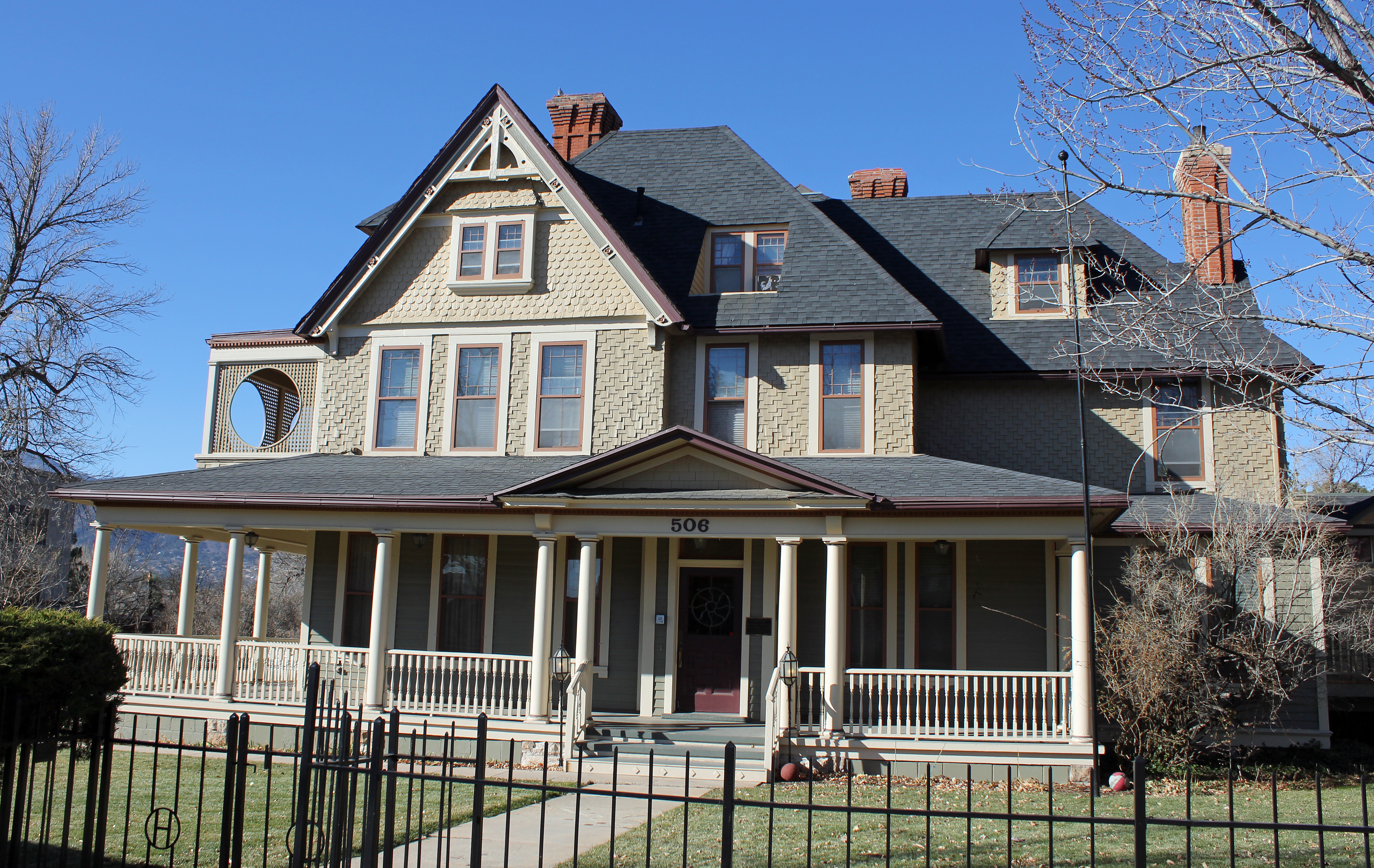
Judson Moss Bemis House, the childhood home of Alice Bemis Taylor

Alice Bemis was born in Newton, Massachusetts to Alice Cogswell Bemis and Judson Moss Bemis, philanthropist and founder of J. M. Bemis Company.

Alice and Judson Moss Bemis had five children: Judson, born in 1867 in St. Louis; Albert Farwell born in Boston; Maude, Lucy and Alice all born in Newton, Massachusetts. (Note: Maude married Reginald H. Parsons. Lucy Gardner died of scarlet fever; She lived less than three years. The eldest, Judson, died of pneumonia while at a St. Louis, Missouri school. He died before his parents' deaths.)

The Bemis family moved to Colorado Springs in 1881 for Alice's mother's health when the girl was 4 years of age. Her mother may have had tuberculosis. After a few years, Alice Cogswell Bemis health was restored sufficiently for her to live a "comparatively normal life", after which the family spent the summers on the East Coast.

The family first lived near Helen Hunt Jackson and William Jackson on Weber Street. From 1885, they lived at the Judson Moss Bemis House on Cascade Avenue. Judson Moss Bemis lived in the home several months a year and conducted business and lived the rest of the year in Boston.

She lived a life of a child of wealthy parents, having attended private schools in Colorado Springs, spent the summers on the East Coast and, with her sister Maude and her mother, studied and traveled in Europe in 1896. Taylor enjoyed playing tennis, riding horses, picnicking in the canons and at Garden of the Gods and ice skating. She attended parties given by the Bells at Briarhurst and the Palmers at Glen Eyrie and formed the "Cheap and Hungry Dances" with her sister and girlfriends.

Taylor had a lifetime enjoyment of reading aloud. She and several of her friends formed a reading club and read aloud and discussed articles from the Atlantic Monthly magazine or books.

== Personal life ==
Alice Bemis married Frederick Morgan Taylor, a stockbroker, in 1903. He enjoyed camping, hunting and fishing. The couple camped, with few comforts, in the Rocky Mountains and Adirondack Mountains. and the couple had an adopted daughter named Alice Doree, who lived in Maine as an adult.

Taylor collected rare books and books on western Americana. Some of her rare books included A 1545 edition of Orlando Furioso, a Pierre de Ronsard First Folio published in 1584, and autographed copy of William Congreve's Love for Love, and 2 bound volumes of British poets letters and signatures. She also collected Hispanic Santos made in New Mexico and Colorado and Southwestern Native American artifacts. Taylor had a keen interest in architecture and early American glass.

After her husband had died, Taylor donated an organ and provided monies for ongoing concerts at Grace and St. Stephen's Episcopal Church as a memorial to her husband.

The Taylors built a home and lived at 1238 Wood Avenue and built a summer estate, called La Foret, in Black Forest on 500 acres. The main building, Ponderosa Lodge, was built in 1928 by Jacques Benedict. Her husband died before he visited the property. In his honor, Taylor built the Taylor Memorial Chapel, designed by John Gaw Meem, in 1929. The Bemis-Taylor Foundation deeded the property to the Colorado Congregation Church following Taylor's death in 1942. It is now known as the Rocky Mountain Conference of the United Church of Christ.

== Philanthropy ==
Her mother "had the heart and will to bring all the happiness she could to others" and her father "valued the 'blessedness of drudgery'". As a result, Taylor had a "devotion to duty" that spurred her philanthropic interests and desire to make the world better for her fellow man and woman. She had the ability to "envision the lofty enterprise and at the same time to execute the daily kindness."

Judson Moss Bemis donated $25 million over the course of his life and was quoted as saying: "If you stand all your life for right principles and leave your country better than you found it, your day in the world has been worthwhile."

It was said of her philanthropy: "There must be three things which helped to shape the major philanthropies of Alice Bemis Taylor's life: an inner compulsion to share what she had; the Bemis Building Bug, as Mrs. Taylor herself described it, with its fascination for architecture; and a fervent desire to bring beauty to the lives of those who had little or none." She founded the Bemis-Taylor Foundation in 1927 to manage her multiple philanthropic projects. It was dissolved in 1974.

=== Colorado College ===
Taylor donated monies to Colorado College. She funded improvements in college buildings, provided scholarships, and was the first woman trustee of Colorado College, 1934–1937. The Colorado College Special Collections benefited from a donation by Taylor of 290 works and letters by writers and poets from the United States and Britain.

A dining hall, built off of Bemis Hall, was constructed in 1956 and named for Alice Bemis Taylor.

=== Colorado Springs Fine Arts Center ===
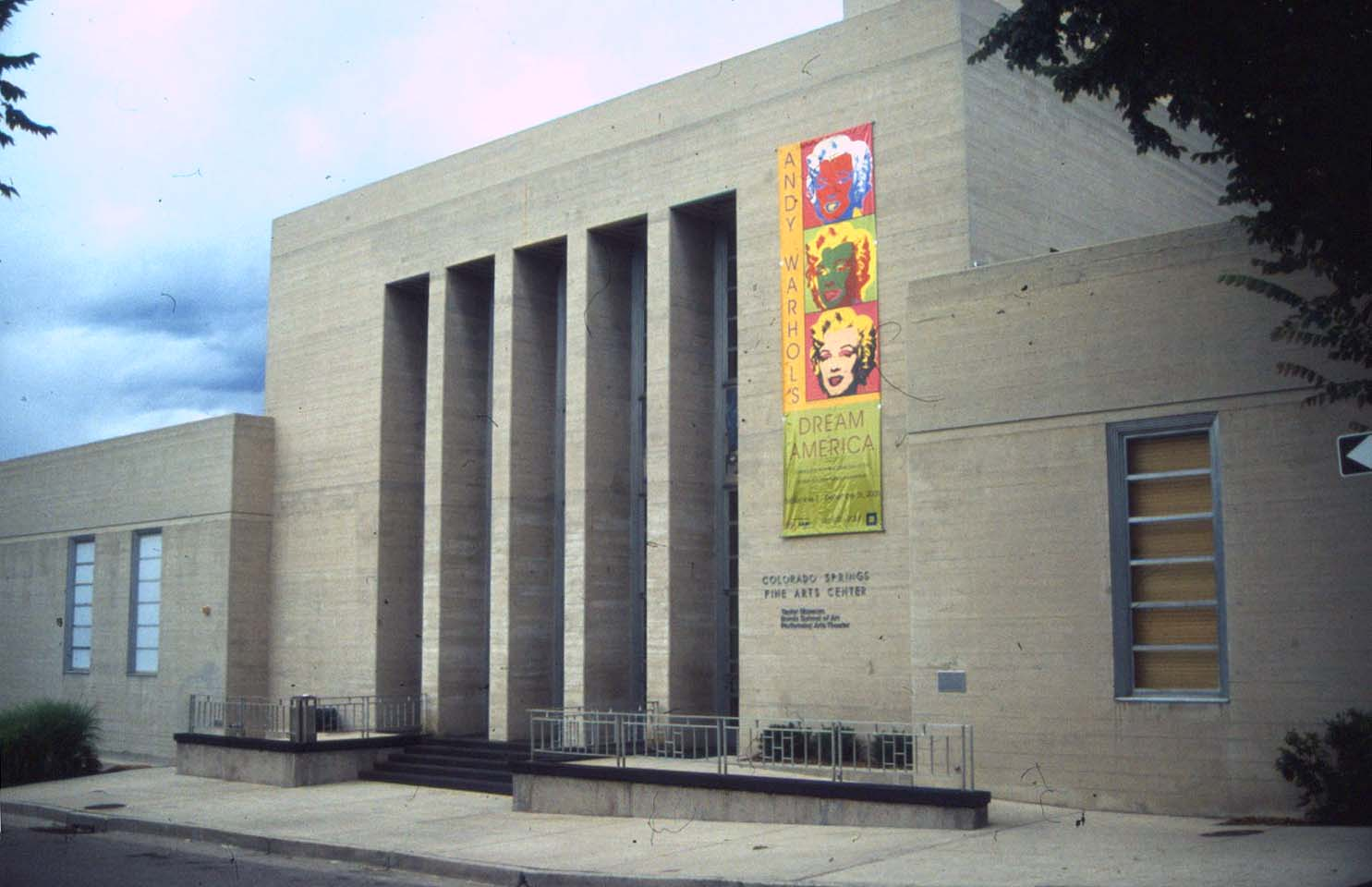
Colorado Springs Fine Arts Center

With $600,000, she funded the 1936 construction of the Colorado Springs Fine Arts Center and provided a $400,000 donation for an endowment. It was built on property owned by the Broadmoor Art Academy. Constructed during the Great Depression, Taylor saw the project as a means of employment for unemployed laborers. Over its history, the multi-use center has been used as a gallery, theatre, museum, research library, art school and music room. Taylor donated her extensive Indian and Hispanic art and her collection of 6,000 volumes of Americana. She envisioned a place that would be accessible to all people, with no admission charge.

=== Colorado Springs Day Nursery ===
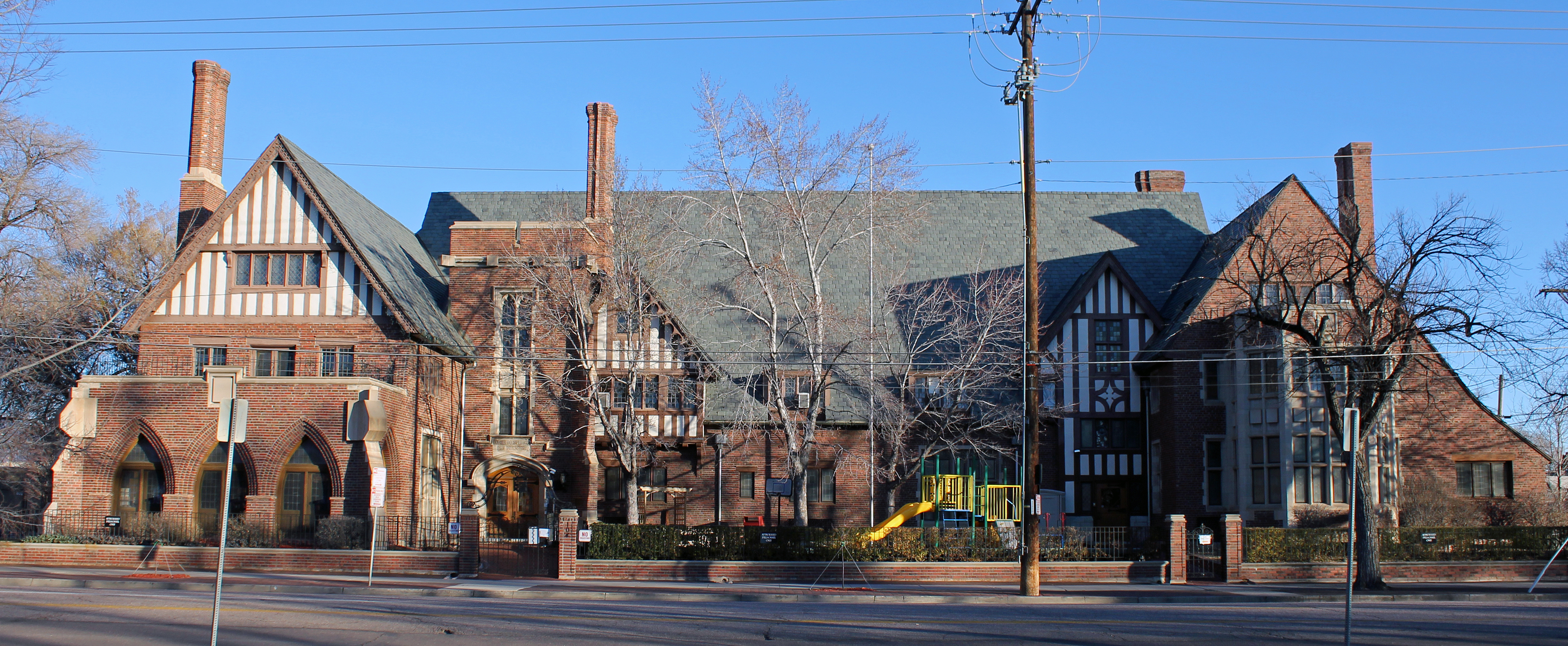
Colorado Springs Day Nursery

In 1897, the day nursery was founded by Taylor and other Colorado Springs women. Taylor funded the construction of the Tudor building in memory of her mother. On Christmas 1923, the building opened and $20 gold pieces ($250 in 2009 dollars) were handed out to workers who had constructed the building. It was then called the Colorado Springs Day Nursery and Taylor was its president.

=== Child Guidance Clinic ===
Taylor founded the Child Guidance Clinic for the psychiatric care of children. To fund the clinic, Taylor created the Bemis-Taylor Foundation in December 1927. The clinic opened in January 1928. In 1964, the clinic was renamed the Pikes Peak Mental Health Clinic when it began treating adults. In 1970, it was renamed the Pikes Peak Family Counseling and Mental Health Center.

=== Other ===
She provided the largest contributions by an individual to the city's Community Chest and provided anonymous donations to those in need. She provided an endowment for the Glockner Hospital, now Penrose Hospital, maternity ward. She helped fund the purchase of the Rock Ledge Ranch Historic Site.

== Colorado Women's Hall of Fame ==
In 2010, Taylor was inducted into the Colorado Women's Hall of Fame.

== Death ==
On June 23, 1942, Taylor died; She was buried next to her husband at Evergreen Cemetery. Her estate left a total of $15.7 million to Colorado College, the Fine Arts Center, Day Nursery, and Bemis-Taylor Foundation. Her daughter, Doree, received $75,000 in Bemis stock, her mother's home and its furnishings.
