= Boulder Crescent Place Historic District =

Historic district in Colorado, US

- U.S. National Register of Historic Places
- U.S. Historic district
- Colorado State Register of Historic Properties No. 5EP.1063
- Location within Colorado Location within the United States
- Location: 9 & 11 W. Boulder; 312, 318, 320 N. Cascade, Colorado Springs, Colorado
- Coordinates: 38°50′22″N 104°49′30″W
- Built: 1894 to 1901
- Architectural style: Colonial Revival, Late Victorian
- NRHP reference No.: 87001555
- CSRHP No.: 5EP.1063

Significant dates
- Added to NRHP: 1987
- Designated CSRHP: 1987

Boulder Crescent Place Historic District is a historic area in Colorado Springs, Colorado along West Boulder and Cascade Avenue near the intersection of the two streets. It is a National Register of Historic Places listing and is on the Colorado State Register of Historic Properties.

== Overview ==
Five houses in the district are examples of Dutch Colonial Revival and Queen Anne style architecture in the United States built in Colorado Springs between 1894 and 1901. The city grew dramatically when people came to the Pikes Peak region at the turn-of-the-century "for their health and to enjoy the natural scenic beauty." The Boulder Crescent Place area is located near Memorial Valley Park and the streets are lined with trees planted when the homes were developed at the turn of the 20th century.

== History ==
The Boulder - Cascade block was laid out in 1883. It was conveniently located near the downtown business district, the railroad station and Monument Valley Park. The district is significant for its architectural charm, retention of its original appearance and residential use, setting along the wide, tree-line Cascade Avenue and proximity to the park.

The homes at 312 and 320 N. Cascade were built on land as subdivided in 1883. After the land was subdivided into smaller lots in 1898, the other three houses in the district were soon built in close proximity to one another. Although originally intended as quality single-family residences, some of the buildings became boarding houses for the large number of tourists or infirm who came to Colorado.

== Houses ==
Address	Image	Year	Architecture	Comments
312 N. Cascade Avenue		1895	Late Victorian	The 2 1/2-story house is currently provides multifamily housing. It has a "gabled roof, side dormers, and a three sided dormer."
318 N. Cascade Avenue		1900-1901	Dutch Colonial Revival	The two-story home "is an excellent example of Dutch Colonial Revival architectural style with a gambrel roof, dormers, and colonial style windows, porch columns and detailing... The center dormer has a Palladian window and decorative shingling... The entrance door has ornate beveled sidelights."
320 N. Cascade Avenue		1894	Queen Anne	The large three-story gabled home sits diagonally at the intersection of W. Boulder and N. Cascade Avenue. Aside from the striking gables, the home had a large porch, beveled windows, a bay window and a third story porch. Inside are Van Briggle tile, ornate fireplaces and leaf and garland motif carvings. In December 1982 there was a fire that killed two people, remained abandoned and was condemned. It was purchased in December 1984 and renovated.
9 W. Boulder		1899-1900	Queen Anne and Colonial Revival	The 2 1/2-story Queen Anne home also has elements of Colonial Revival architecture. The home has "a two story open porch topped with a conical cap and multi-gabled roof" and an enclosed porch on the second story. Beveled windows are found on the west side of the house and at the front entrance. Van Briggle tile surrounds the firebox alongside two fireplaces.
11 W. Boulder		1899	Colonial Revival	The two-story Colonial Revival home has an "eclectic mix of forms and detailing". It has a steep gabled roof, bay windows and a square porch with columns. In the front of the home is the original black iron hitching post.
