= Colorado Springs Day Nursery =

- U.S. National Register of Historic Places
- Colorado State Register of Historic Properties No. 5EP.1191
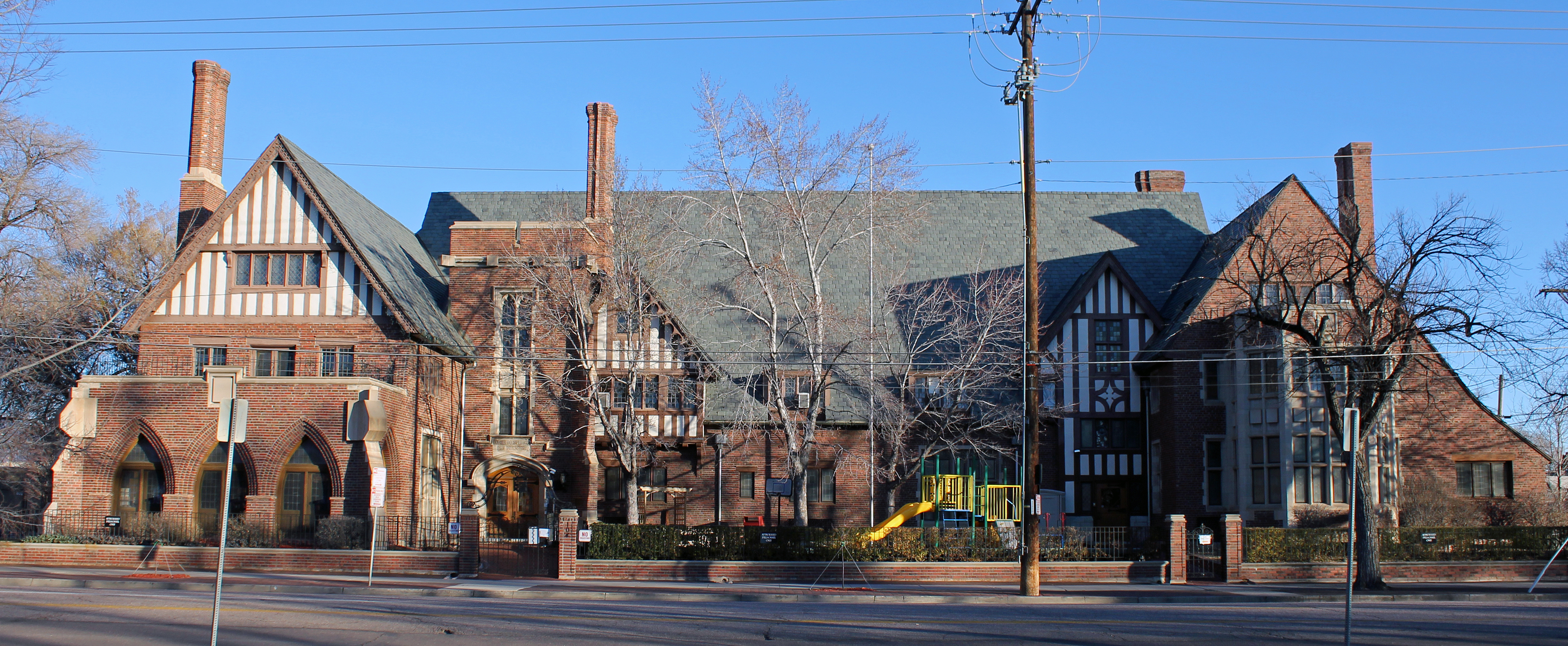

- Location within Colorado Location within the United States
- Location: 104 East Rio Grande Street, Colorado Springs, Colorado
- Coordinates: 38°49′28″N 104°49′23″W
- Built: 1922
- Architect: William White Stickney, Benjamin Franklin Hawkins
- Architectural style: Tudor Revival
- NRHP reference No.: 90000304
- CSRHP No.: 5EP.1191

Significant dates
- Added to NRHP: February 23, 1990
- Designated CSRHP: February 23, 1990

Colorado Springs Day Nursery is a school in Colorado Springs, Colorado. The building is on the National Register of Historic Places.

== History ==
=== Colorado Springs Day Nursery Association ===
The Colorado Springs Day Nursery Association was founded in 1897 by 14 women to provide child care for working women. In the 1900s medical services were provided to children. The daily fees were 10¢ for the first child in a family and 5¢ for each additional child. The association became part of the Community Chest, now United Way, in 1922.

Alice Bemis Taylor was one of the founders of the day care center and wrote in a letter to the Nursery's board in 1915: "If we did not hope for more than we can accomplish, we would not be working up to a higher ideal." She funded the construction of the Colorado Springs Day Nursery building in memory of her mother, Alice Cogswell Bemis. Christmas 1923, the new Tudor building was opened and $20 gold pieces ($250 in 2009 dollars) were handed out to workers who had built the nursery building. It was then called the Colorado Springs Day Nursery and Taylor was its president. The building construction cost was $262,040. (Note: The Community Chest, which was later United Way, was established to fund-raise for 20 city programs, including the Colorado Springs Day Nursery, Sunnyrest Sanatarium, and the School Milk Fund.)

In the 1930s the nursery offered residential and day care services for children. A wading pool was dedicated in that decade. In the 1940s the cost for residential care was $10 per child. Licensing began in the 1940s. In the 1950s, the nursery offered care for dependent and neglected children, it provided care for up to 105 children, and had a 14-bed infirmary installed. The nursery was able to care for up to 122 children in the 1960s. Overnight care was discontinued in the 1970s.

=== Early Connections Learning Centers ===
In 1973, the nursery association merged with the Child Day Care Center and their resulting organization was named the Child Nursery Centers. In addition to the Colorado Springs Day Nursery Center on East Rio Grande, there are also locations at Antlers Place, South Chelton (1974, relocated to South Chelton in 1984) and Sand Creek Center (1995). In 2000 the organization began the Home Network program that partnered with child care providers. In 2003 the organization opened Court Care, in partnership with Court Care for the Pikes Peak Region, to provide child care while parents attended to "court related activities." In 2008 2 school age sites were opened in the Harrison School district. The organization changed their name to Early Connections Learning Centers in 2010. The organization said that the new name "better reflected our broad range of services for children and families."

Early Connections Learning Centers implemented a Professional Development Program and in 2001 through 2003 was nominated for El Pomar Foundation's "Award for Excellence".

== Services ==
The Day Nursery can provides services for up to 171 children, aged 2 1/2 to 14 years of age. There are 2 classrooms for school age children and 3 classrooms for preschool children. They partner with the Community Partnership For Child Development, including the Head Start Program, and the Colorado Preschool Program in Colorado Springs School District 11. It became National Association for the Education of Young Children (NAEYC) accredited in 2010.

== See also ==
- History of Colorado Springs, Colorado
