= Gwynne–Love House =

Historic house in Colorado, United States

- U.S. National Register of Historic Places
- Colorado State Register of Historic Properties
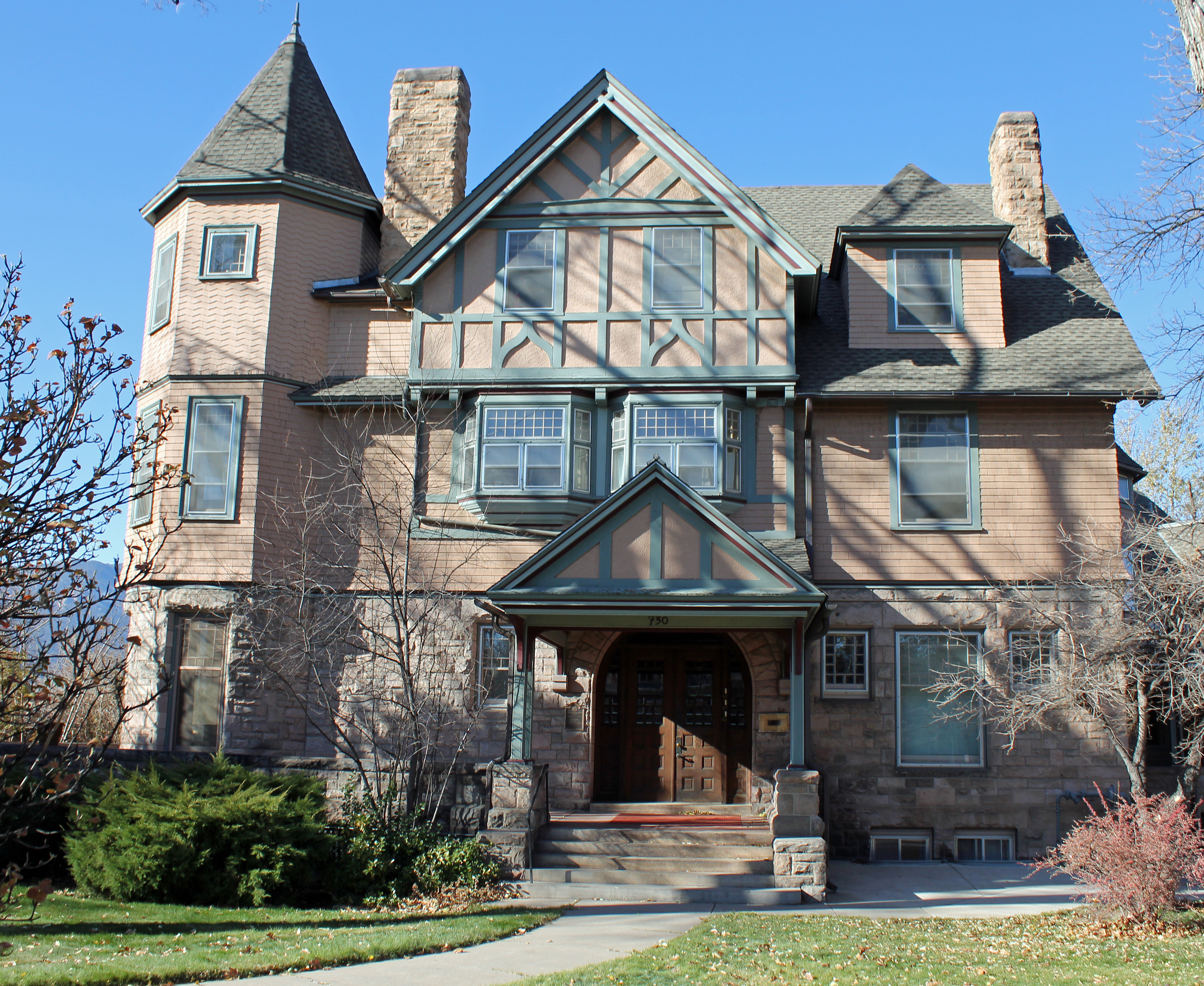

- Location within Colorado
- Location: 730 N. Cascade Avenue, Colorado Springs, CO
- Coordinates: 38°50′42″N 104°49′29″W
- Built: 1886
- Architect: Willard B. Perkins
- Architectural style: Queen Anne
- NRHP reference No.: 87000010
- CSRHP No.: 5EP.3956
- Added to NRHP: February 5, 1987

Gwynne–Love House, also known as Goldmuntz Cascade House, is a historic house in Colorado Springs, Colorado that was placed on the National Register of Historic Places and the Colorado State Register of Historic Properties in 1987.

== Geography ==
The house is located in central Colorado Springs on a bluff overlooking Monument Valley Park near Colorado College and the Colorado Springs Fine Arts Center.

== Description ==
Edmiston Gwynne had a Queen Anne house built with English architectural details that was designed by Willard B. Perkins in 1886. The original owner died soon after its completion however, and the building was converted into a boarding house to meet the demand generated by the 1891 Cripple Creek gold discovery. It was purchased in 1914 by the Love family that had moved to Colorado from Indianapolis and used as a private residence. It was converted back to apartments in the 1950s. The house is significant as one of the last remaining stately homes built in the early history of Colorado Springs.
