= First Congregational Church (Colorado Springs, Colorado) =

Historic church in Colorado, United States

- U.S. National Register of Historic Places
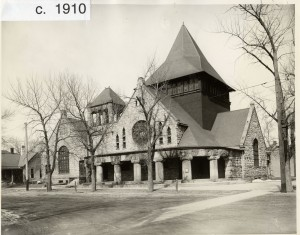
- 1910 photograph of First Congregational Church

- Location within Colorado Location within the United States
- Location: 20 E. St. Vrain St., Colorado Springs, Colorado
- Coordinates: 38°50′28″N 104°49′22″W
- Area: less than one acre
- Built: 1889
- Architect: Henry Rutgers Marshall; Dozier, Joseph, et al.
- Architectural style: Romanesque
- NRHP reference No.: 02001258
- Added to NRHP: October 31, 2002

The First Congregational Church in Colorado Springs, Colorado is a historic church at 20 East Saint Vrain Street. It was listed on the National Register of Historic Places in 2002.

The church was organized and founded in 1874 in conjunction with the founding of Colorado College. The first two ministers of the church, Rev. Jonathan Edwards and Rev. James Dougherty, also held positions with the college. The present building was completed in 1889 at an estimated cost of $40,000. Its design is in the Richardsonian Romanesque style and is constructed of Colorado Wall Mountain Tuft (rhyolite) quarried near Castle Rock, Colorado. The architect was Henry Rutgers Marshall of New York, acclaimed student of Henry Hobson Richardson, and there is only one other church known to have been designed by him: Arlington Avenue Presbyterian Church in Brooklyn, New York (1905, Arlington Avenue Presbyterian Church – Brooklyn, NY ). The first service in the current building was James Greggheld on 21 July 1889 and the new building soon became a landmark in Colorado Springs. An early article in the then Weekly Gazette newspaper commented that “the design of the building is unique and has attracted much attention and admiration.”

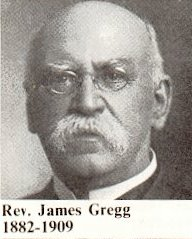
James Gregg

“Surely few churches there are with so many pillars. The many pillars in our portico seem suggestive of the spiritual life of the church within, its strength, its dignity, its peace.” – Dr. James Gregg, October 1914

The cornerstone of the present church was laid on September 8, 1888, and the first services were held in the new building on July 21, 1889. Dedication was delayed until October, however, when the pipe organ crafted by Hook and Hastings of Boston was installed. Our faith community has been housed in this structure ever since, making our facility the oldest church building in Colorado Springs continuously used by the same congregation.

The First Congregational Church was placed on the National Register on October 31, 2002. In partnership with the Colorado Historical Society's State Historical Fund, the church and Founders’ Room addition (1903) have undergone restoration to their 1910 appearance.

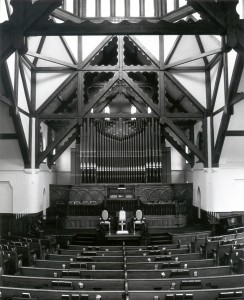
Sanctuary Interior

The interior of the church is in the plan of a Greek cross with an octagonal dome rising above the north nave. The lower walls of the Sanctuary are paneled in light oak to match the pews with notable stained glass throughout. The original organ was designed by Hook and Hastings of Boston and is the oldest organ in continuous use in Colorado Springs.

Additions to the present building include the Founders Room in 1903, the Christian Education Building in 1959 and the Atrium in 1996. Alterations and improvement were made to the main building in 1910 and extensive restoration work to the interior of the building was completed in 2011.

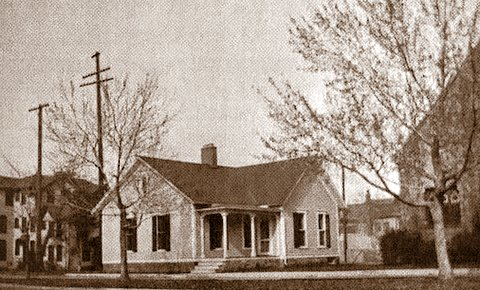
Gregg Library

The Gregg Library: The importance of books and a library has always been a significant part of First Congregational Church's history. When the present sanctuary was built in 1888-89, a library was included, shelved on one wall of the Sacristy. The library found a new home 46 years later in a small frame house sitting on the church's west side. That house was bought and donated to the church in memory of Rev. James B. Gregg, who served as pastor for 27 years. It was named the Gregg Memorial Library Building. The building housed a study and classrooms. In addition, Dr. Gregg's children gave a $10,000 bequest dedicated to the library. That bequest still funds the library's budget today. The Gregg Library is located in the West Building attached to the church.
