= Henry Rutgers Marshall =

American architect and psychologist

Henry Rutgers Marshall FAIA
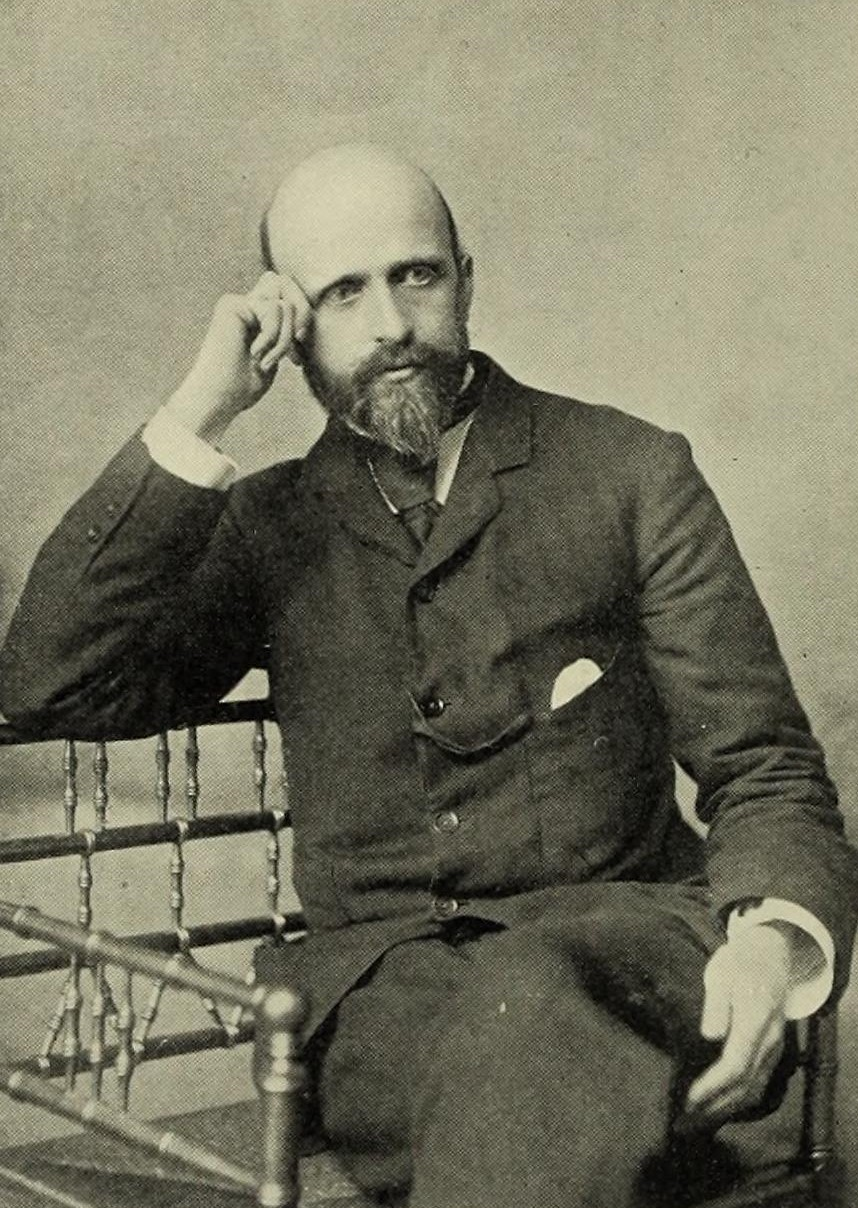
- Born: July 22, 1852; New York City, New York
- Died: May 3, 1927 (aged 74); Woodbury, Connecticut
- Education: Columbia University, A.B. (1873), M.A. (1875)
- Notable work: Rudyard Kipling House; First Congregational Church
- Spouse: Julia Robbins Gillman (m. 1881; died 1888)

16th President of the American Psychological Association
- In office 1907
- Preceded by: James Rowland Angell
- Succeeded by: George M. Stratton

President of the New York Chapter of the American Institute of Architects
- In office 1902–1904

Henry Rutgers Marshall FAIA (July 22, 1852 – May 3, 1927) was an American architect and psychologist.

== Early life ==
Henry Rutgers Marshall was born July 22, 1852, in New York City to Henry Perry Marshall and Cornelia Eliza Conrad. His mother was descendant of Everardus Bogardus. Related to the famous Rutgers family of New York City and New Jersey, Marshall had a privileged upbringing. He attended the finest New York private schools as a child, and studied architecture as both an undergrad and graduate student at Columbia. He graduated from Columbia College with a Bachelor of Arts in 1873 and from Columbia University with a Master of Arts degree in architecture in 1875. At this time in Marshall's life, psychology wasn't a concern to him.

He began practicing architecture, his lifelong career, two years after graduating in 1878. His most famous designs include Rudyard Kipling's house Naulakha in Dummerston, Vermont, the First Congregational Church in Colorado Springs, Colorado, and the Old Buildings of Brearley School in New York City. He was most known for his designs of country houses. Marshall's accomplishments in the world of architecture did not go unnoticed. He was elected to be a Fellow of the American Institute of Architects, and was eventually given the honor of becoming president of the institute's New York chapter. Marshall was also active with the New York City Art Commission, where he served as the executive secretary.

== Contributions to psychology ==
Aside from his devoted career in architecture, Marshall became fascinated by psychology and philosophy, and began studying paths where the two subjects intersected. Marshall pursued these subjects without any formal training in psychology or philosophy, whatsoever; rather, they were merely interests to him. He developed a wide range of interests in topics including intelligence, sensation, consciousness, emotion, religion, instinct, synesthesia, and dreams. Marshall began writing about these topics but they largely went unnoticed until the publishing of his first book.

His first major appearance came with the publishing of his book Pain, Pleasure, and Aesthetics in 1894, known as his most famous and influential work. In this book, Marshall rejected the structuralist ideals of physiological and anatomical evidence pointing to pleasure and pain sensations. He further criticized the work of Goldsheider, who discovered pressure spots, cold spots, and heat spots on the surfaces of skin. Marshall believed that Goldsheider was too quick to cite physiology for his findings.

In Pain, Pleasure, and Aesthetics, Marshall further went on to argue that beauty is a matter of the hedonic effect, characterized by pleasure. He believed that no single characteristic was common among all beautiful things except for the ability to please. William James, now known as one of the most influential American philosophers, praised Rutgers’ book endlessly. James described the work as "epoch-making" and "full of shrewd and original psychology." James and many others believed that Marshall had made a great contribution to psychology in this book.

Soon after the publishing of this famous book, he wrote a series of lectures on aesthetics, which he delivered as an honorary lecturer at Columbia University, his alma mater. Rutgers also lectured at Harvard University, the Nineteenth Century Club of New York City, the Contemporary Club of Philadelphia, and Yale Art School. In 1904, he gave a principle address on aesthetics before the St. Louis International Congress of Arts and Sciences.

Marshall's views on aesthetics were a combination of sensational aspects, proposed by Hermann Lotze, emotional aspects, discussed by James and Mill, and intellectual factures, focused on by Immanuel Kant and Ladd. Marshall combined all of these aspects into his own system that held pain and pleasure as the basis for all esthetic experiences and judgments.

He wrote on topics including the nature of emotion, desire, pleasure, pain, and evolution. His published articles and books in addition to Pain, Pleasure, and Aesthetics are Aesthetic Principles, in 1895, Instinct and Reason, in 1898, The Relation of Aesthetics to Psychology and Philosophy, in 1905, Human and Other Types of Consciousness, in 1905, War and the Ideal of Peace, in 1915, Mind and Conduct, in 1919, and The Beautiful, in 1924.

Though Marshall never held an academic position in the field of psychology, he became a figure that many psychologists looked to. He was influential of Alexander Bain, Mary Calkins, Josiah Royce, and Edward Titchener. At the height of his fame in the field of psychology, he was elected the 16th president of the American Psychological Association in 1907. Marshall began sharing his opinions and concerns more heavily once he had a larger audience.

In 1909, Marshall wrote a paper in response to Titchener's book Lectures on the Elementary Psychology of Feeling and Attention. Titchener and Marshall shared views in psychology, however disagreed about the nature of psychology and the importance of sensations. In Marshall's paper, he argued against Titchener's idea that pains and pleasures are sensational. Marshall believed that they are instead a mental quality. He felt as though Titchener was far too focused on sensations and emotional states resulting from pain and pleasure.

While many admired Marshall, he was highly critical and argumentative about others’ views. He repeatedly argued with psychologists who sough physiological explanations for psychological events, pegging these individuals as too dependent on natural sciences. Marshall was also critical of behaviorists. He claimed that behaviorists were truly confused in believing that behavior should have been the target of psychology. Marshall repeatedly chastised behaviorists claiming to be the only real psychologists. Understandably, many individuals who viewed psychology from a physiological or behaviorist perspective grew to dislike him. Marshall went on to attack functional psychology and claim that it wasn't a real branch of psychology.

Marshall was bold and firm in his opinions. This led to him having many admirers but also many who disliked him greatly. As time passed, his popularity decreased significantly. American psychology was undergoing rapid changes. In 1913, Marshall wrote an article "Is Psychology Evaporating?" in which he angrily blamed other psychologists for losing sight of the purpose of psychology. Many were tired of hearing Marshall's complaints and attacks. His ideas were losing interest rapidly and he refused to change his conceptions of psychology. Despite his great interests in theories on education and music, Marshall ignored any advancement on the subjects.

He published his last book, The Beautiful, in 1924. This was a continuation on his initial book Pain, Pleasure, and Aesthetics and Aesthetic Principles, that had brought him so much fame 30 years before. Many psychologists saw this book as a sad attempt by Marshall to come back to fame. D. W. Prall accused Marshall of having little understanding of the realities of aesthetics in The Beautiful. He described it as unwelcome and an unfortunate ending to what began as a promising contribution to psychological theory. In many ways, Marshall was the cause of his own demise in the world of psychology.

Marshall continued to restrict psychology to his own specific views and argued with anyone who disagreed with him. The world of psychology lost interest in him. He death went unnoticed by the world of psychology, so much so that the American Psychological Association did not even publish an obituary for its past president.

== Family and death ==
In 1881, Marshall married Julia Robbins Gillman, who died in 1888. He had one daughter with Gillman, who also predeceased him. Marshall was largely a loner. His lack of familial contact led him to focus greatly on his work in architecture and his other interests. He died and was buried in Woodbury, Connecticut, in 1927.

== Marshall's views on war ==
Marshall's discussion on war fell during the First World War. Rutgers absolutely hated war. He was deeply fearful of a German victory. When America finally entered war, he became extremely patriotic. Amidst his fear and concerns of war, Marshall began writing on how a pacifist might fit into a world at war in his article The Pacifist at War, published in The Atlantic Monthly in May, 1918.

In this article, Marshall described war as the greatest of all evils. He explained his confliction in being a patriotic pacifist. Against his prior beliefs, Marshall stated that pacifists needed to lay aside the thought of peace and instead devote all energies to anything that might yield victory. Though it was against his original pacifistic beliefs, he encouraged other pacifists to make a sacrifice in going against their beliefs in an effort to take a step towards long-term peace. Marshall believed that once this massive war came to an end, true peace would be obtained. Until that point, pacifists must join in support of their country.

== Contributions to psychology after death ==
The awareness of Marshall's contributions is reflective of the end of his life. His work has almost completely vanished from today's psychological systems. Theories on pain were debated years after Marshall's death, however his pleasure-pain theory on pain was completely forgotten. Benjamin (1984) views Marshall's legacy to psychology as his system and theories on aesthetics, which proved to be no legacy at all. Though the study of aesthetics is still popular today, it is primarily from an arts and philosophy perspective, with no attention paid to Marshall's work. Marshall is now known as the forgotten APA president.

Stout, Bain, Titchener, Angell, and Calkins took great interest in Marshall's theories, even incorporating it into their own theories on physiology. However, Marshall's refusal to accept the role of nerves in pain resulted in his views becoming outdated and irrelevant. New scientific discoveries pushed his ideas further into history. As these theorists continued in their careers, the influence of Marshall decreased to a point of vanishing.

== Works ==
- Pain, Pleasure, and Æsthetics (1894)
- Æsthetic Principles (1895)
- Instinct and Reason (1898)
- The Relation of Aesthetics to Psychology and Philosophy (1905)
- Human and Other Types of Consciousness (1905)
- Consciousness (1909)
- War and the Ideal of Peace (1915)
