= Steamboat Rock =

Steamboat Rock can refer to some places in the United States:

- Steamboat Rock, Iowa, a town in Hardin County, Iowa
  - Steamboat Rock Consolidated Schools Building, historic school building in Steamboat Rock, Iowa
- Steamboat Rock (Garden of the Gods), a rock in Colorado Springs
- Steamboat Rock (Dinosaur National Monument), a large rock at the confluence of the Green River (Colorado River) and Yampa River in the state of Colorado
- Steamboat Rock State Park in Grant County, Washington (state)
