= Garden of the Gods =

Protected rock formation near Colorado Springs, Colorado

- Ho3o’uu Niitko’usi’i (Arapaho)
- IUCN category III (natural monument or feature)
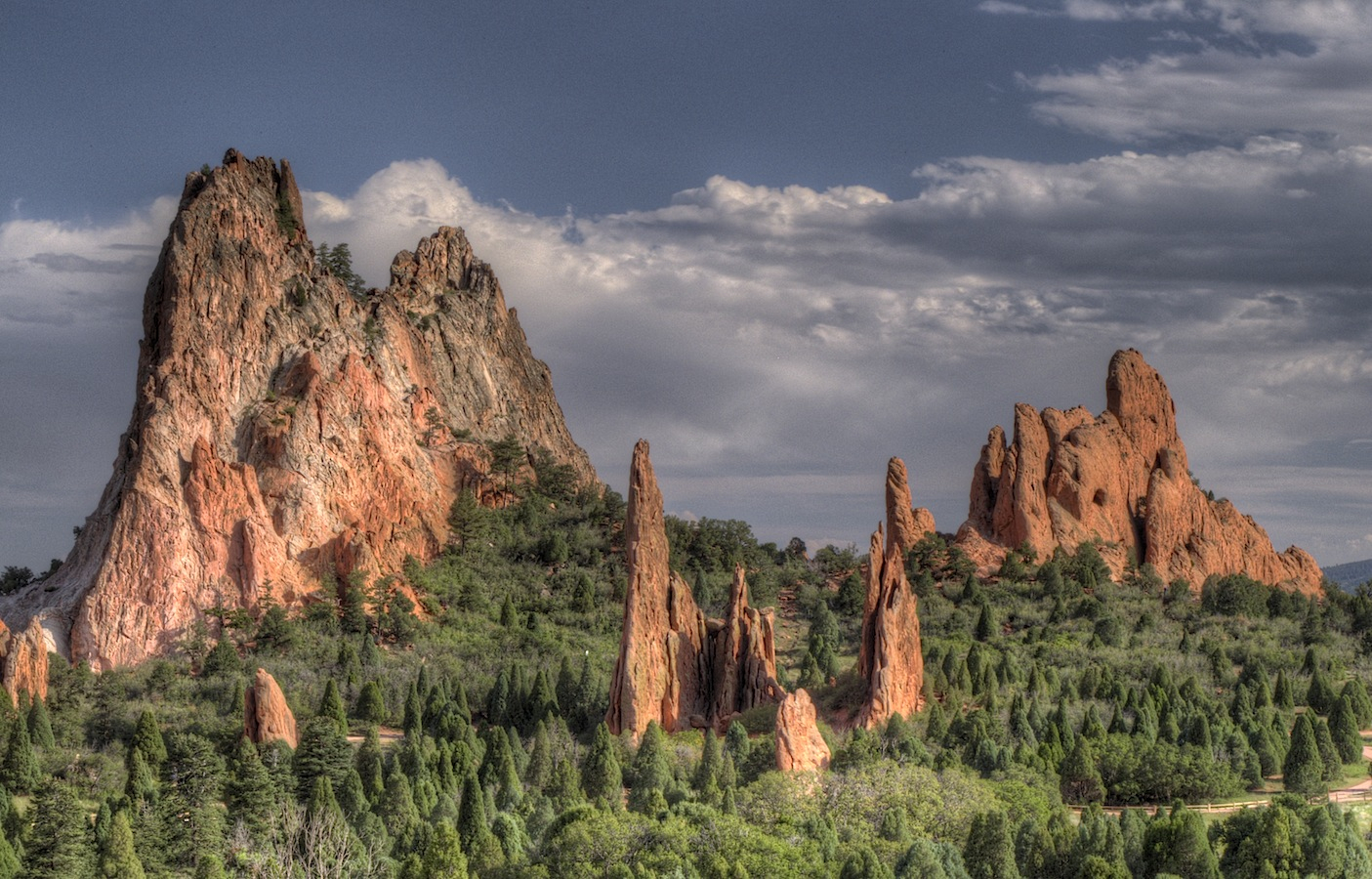
- Interactive map of Garden of the Gods
- Location: Colorado Springs, Colorado, United States
- Coordinates: 38°52′04″N 104°53′28″W
- Area: 1,341.3 acres (5.428 km^{2})
- Established: 1909
- Governing body: Colorado Springs, Colorado
- Website: gardenofgods.com

U.S. National Natural Landmark
- Designated: 1971

Garden of the Gods (Arapaho: Ho3o’uu Niitko’usi’i) is a 1,341.3-acre (542.8 ha) public park located in Colorado Springs, Colorado, United States. 862 acres (349 ha) of the park was designated a National Natural Landmark in 1971.

== Name ==
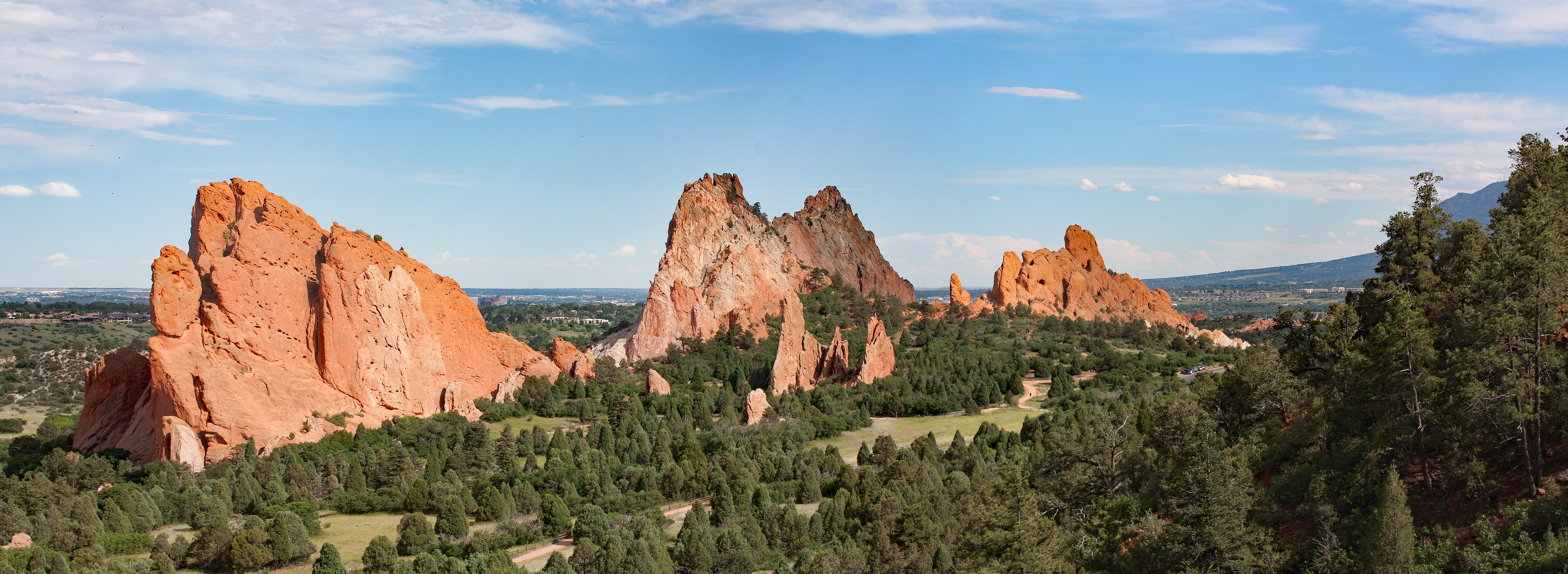
Partial panorama of the formations

The area now known as Garden of the Gods was first called Red Rock Corral by the Europeans. In August 1859, two surveyors who helped to found Colorado City explored the site. One of the surveyors, Melancthon S. Beach, suggested it would be a "capital place for a beer garden". His companion, the young Rufus Cable, awestruck by the impressive rock formations, exclaimed, "Beer garden! Why, it is a fit place for the Gods to assemble. We will call it the Garden of the Gods." However, an 1893 issue of the Colorado Transcript reported that Helen Hunt Jackson assigned the name "the Garden of the Gods":

Riding past the cabin of a prospector from the South in one of the early days of the settlement, she was attracted by a beautifully kept garden in which two negro servants, a man and a woman, were working. In answer to a question the man informed her that his name was Jupiter, and the woman's Juno, whereupon she exclaimed: "Then, this must be the Garden of the Gods."

The name "Garden of the Gods" was also later given to a section of the Iverson Movie Ranch in Chatsworth, California, filled with large sandstone rock formations, because of the area's resemblance to Colorado's Garden of the Gods. The story goes that back in the early days of Hollywood, a movie producer seeking a rocky filming location made a comment to the effect of, "Who needs to go all the way to Colorado—we have our own 'Garden of the Gods' here!" The Iverson family took the comment to heart and began calling their own collection of rock formations the "Garden of the Gods", and the name stuck. Today the main section of Chatsworth's Garden of the Gods has also been preserved as a park.

== History ==
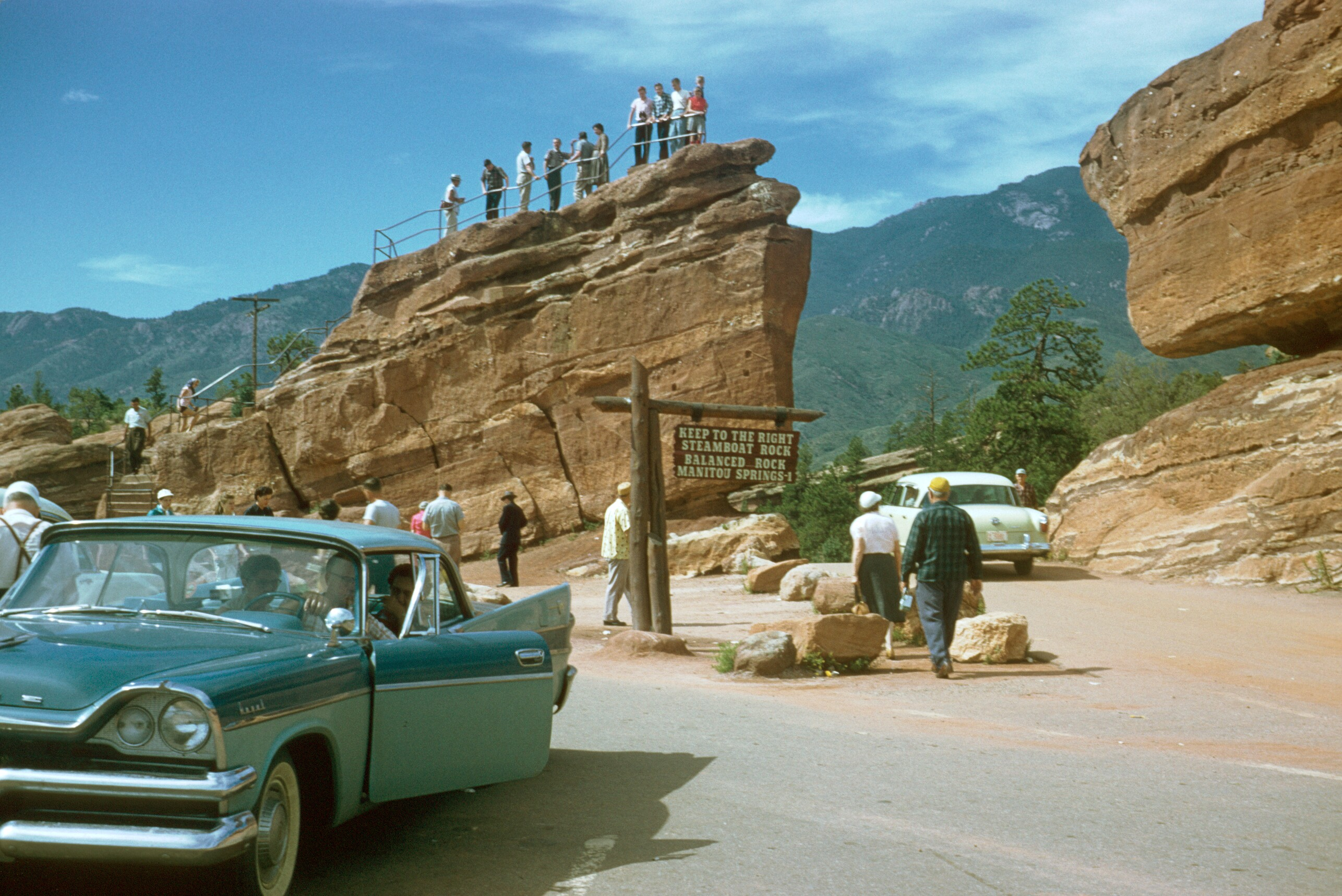
Steamboat Rock in the late 1950s

The garden's red rock formations were created millions of years ago during a geological upheaval event called the Laramide Orogeny. Archaeological evidence shows that prehistoric people visited Garden of the Gods about 1330 BC. At about 250 BC, Native American people camped in the park; they are believed to have been attracted to wildlife and plant life in the area and used overhangs created by the rocks for shelter. Many native peoples have reported a connection to Garden of the Gods: Apache, Cheyenne, Comanche, Kiowa, Lakota, Pawnee, Shoshone and Ute people.

Multiple American Indian Nations traveled through Garden of the Gods. The Utes' oral traditions tell of their creation at the Garden of the Gods, and petroglyphs have been found in the park that are typical of early Utes. The Utes found red rocks to have a spiritual connection and camped near Manitou Springs and the creek near Rock Ledge Ranch bordering Garden of the Gods. The Old Ute Trail went past Garden of the Gods to Ute Pass and led later explorers through Manitou Springs. Starting in the 16th century, Spanish explorers and later European American explorers and trappers traveled through the area, including Lt. John C. Frémont and Lt. George Frederick Ruxton, who recorded their visits in their journals.

In 1879 AD, Charles Elliott Perkins, a friend of William Jackson Palmer, purchased 480 acres (190 ha) of land that included a portion of the present Garden of the Gods. Upon Perkins' death, his family gave the land to the City of Colorado Springs in 1909, with the provision that it would be a free public park. Palmer had owned the Rock Ledge Ranch and upon his death it was donated to the city.

Helen Hunt Jackson wrote of the park, "You wind among rocks of every conceivable and inconceivable shape and size... all bright red, all motionless and silent, with a strange look of having been just stopped and held back in the very climax of some supernatural catastrophe."

In 1995, the Garden of the Gods Visitor and Nature Center was opened just outside the park.

== Geological formations ==
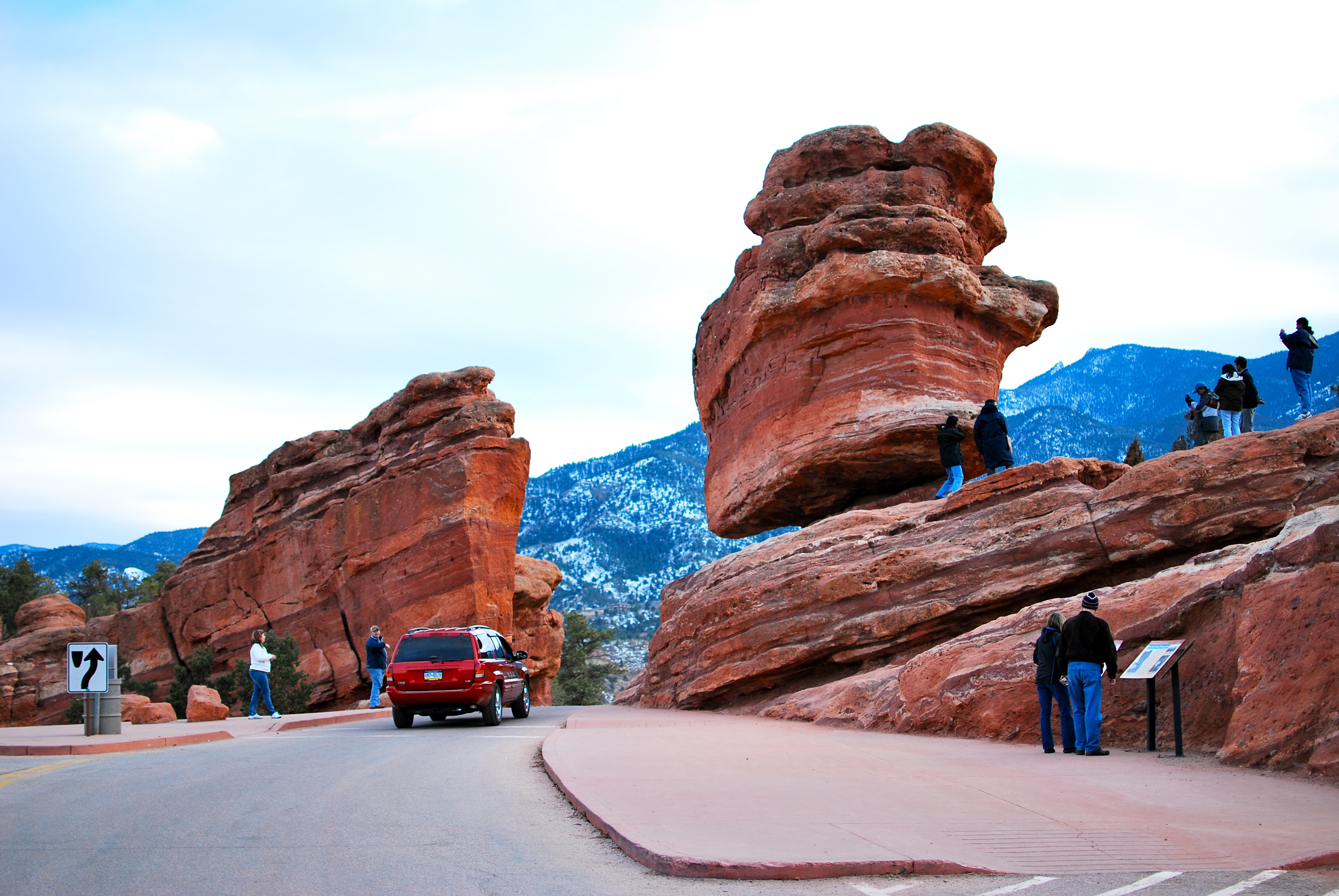
Steamboat Rock and Balanced Rock, March 2010

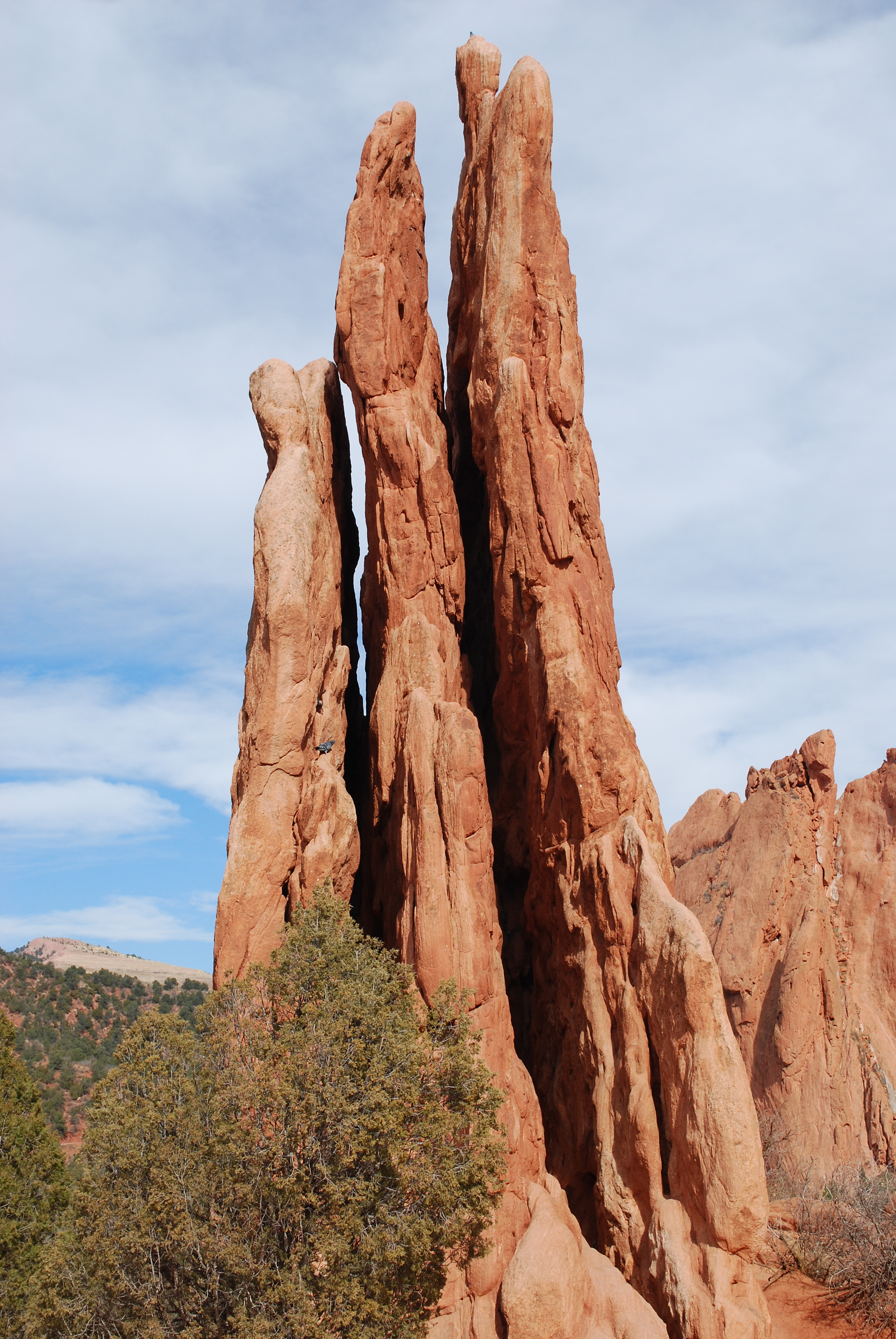
The formation known as the Three Graces

The outstanding geologic features of the park, including Steamboat Rock, the Three Graces, and Balanced Rock, are the ancient sedimentary beds of deep-red, pink and white sandstones, conglomerates and limestone that were deposited horizontally, but have now been tilted vertically and faulted into "fins" by the immense mountain building forces caused by the uplift of the Rocky Mountains and the Pikes Peak massif. The following Pleistocene Ice Age resulted in erosion and glaciation of the rock, creating the present rock formations. Evidence of past ages can be read in the rocks: ancient seas, eroded remains of ancestral mountain ranges, alluvial fans, sandy beaches and great sand dune fields.

== Ecology ==
The Garden of the Gods Park is a rich ecological resource. Retired biology professor Richard Beidleman notes that the park is "the most striking contrast between plains and mountains in North America" with respect to biology, geology, climate, and scenery. The skull of a dinosaur was found in the park in 1878, and was identified in 2006 as a unique species, Theiophytalia kerri. A subspecies of honey ant not previously recorded was also discovered in 1879 and named after the park. Mule deer, bighorn sheep and fox are common. The park is also home to more than 130 species of birds, including white-throated swifts, swallows and canyon wrens.

== Recreation ==
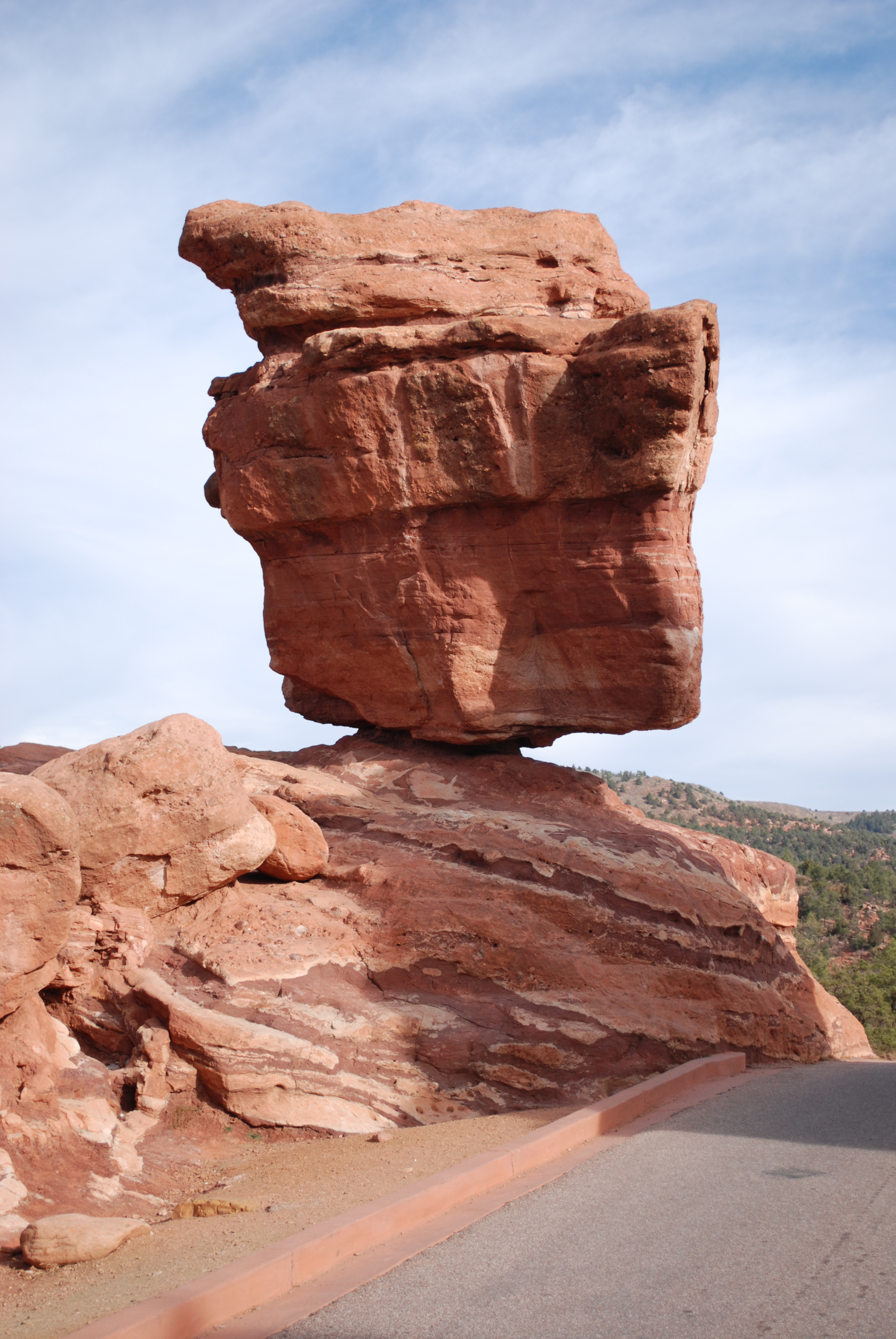
Balanced Rock is a popular spot for photography

The Garden of the Gods Park is popular for hiking, technical rock climbing, road and mountain biking and horseback riding. It attracts more than two million visitors a year, making it the city's most visited park. There are 21 miles (34 km) of trails. Annual events including summer running races, recreational bike rides and Pro Cycling Challenge Prologue also take place in this park.

The main trail in the park, the 1.5-mile (2.4 km) Perkins Central Garden Trail, is paved and wheelchair-accessible, running "through the heart of the park's largest and most scenic red rocks". The trail begins at the North Parking lot, the main parking lot off of Juniper Way Loop.

Because of the unusual and steep rock formations in the park, it is an attractive destination for rock climbers. Rock climbing is permitted, with annual permits obtained at the City of Colorado Springs' website. Climbers are required to follow the "Technical Climbing Regulations and Guidelines", which includes using proper equipment, climbing in parties of two or more, and a ban on staining chalks. Precipitation makes rocks unstable and therefore climbing is not allowed when the rocks are wet or icy. There are fines for unregistered climbers and possibly rescue costs. Several fatalities have occurred over the years, often when unlawful climbers fail to use proper safety equipment, or, more rarely, when a lawful climber falls due to equipment failure or user error.

== Visitor and nature center ==
The Garden of the Gods Visitor and Nature Center is located at 1805 N. 30th Street and offers a view of the park. The center's information center and 30 educational exhibits are owned and operated privately but staffed by some Parks, Recreation and Culture employees of the City of Colorado Springs. A short movie, How Did Those Red Rocks Get There?, runs every 20 minutes. A small portion of the proceeds from the center's privately owned store and cafe support the non-profit Garden of the Gods Foundation; the money is used for maintenance and improvements to the park.

Natural history exhibits include minerals, geology, plants and local wildlife, as well as Native Americans who visited the park. Programs include nature hikes and talks, a Junior Ranger program, narrated bus tours, movies, educational programs and special programs.

== Hours and admission ==
Both the Garden of the Gods Park and the Visitor and Nature Center are free to the public. Park hours are:

- 5:00 a.m. to 10:00 p.m. from May 1 to October 31, and
- 5:00 a.m. to 9:00 p.m. from November 1 to April 30.

The Visitor and Nature Center is open:

- from 9:00 a.m. to 6:00 p.m. from Memorial Day weekend to Labor Day weekend
- from 9:00 a.m. to 5:00 p.m. the rest of the year.

== Designations ==
- National Natural Landmark in 1971
- Great American Public Place of 2011 by the American Planning Association. The Great American Places are defined by many criteria, including architectural features, accessibility, functionality and community involvement.

== Gallery ==
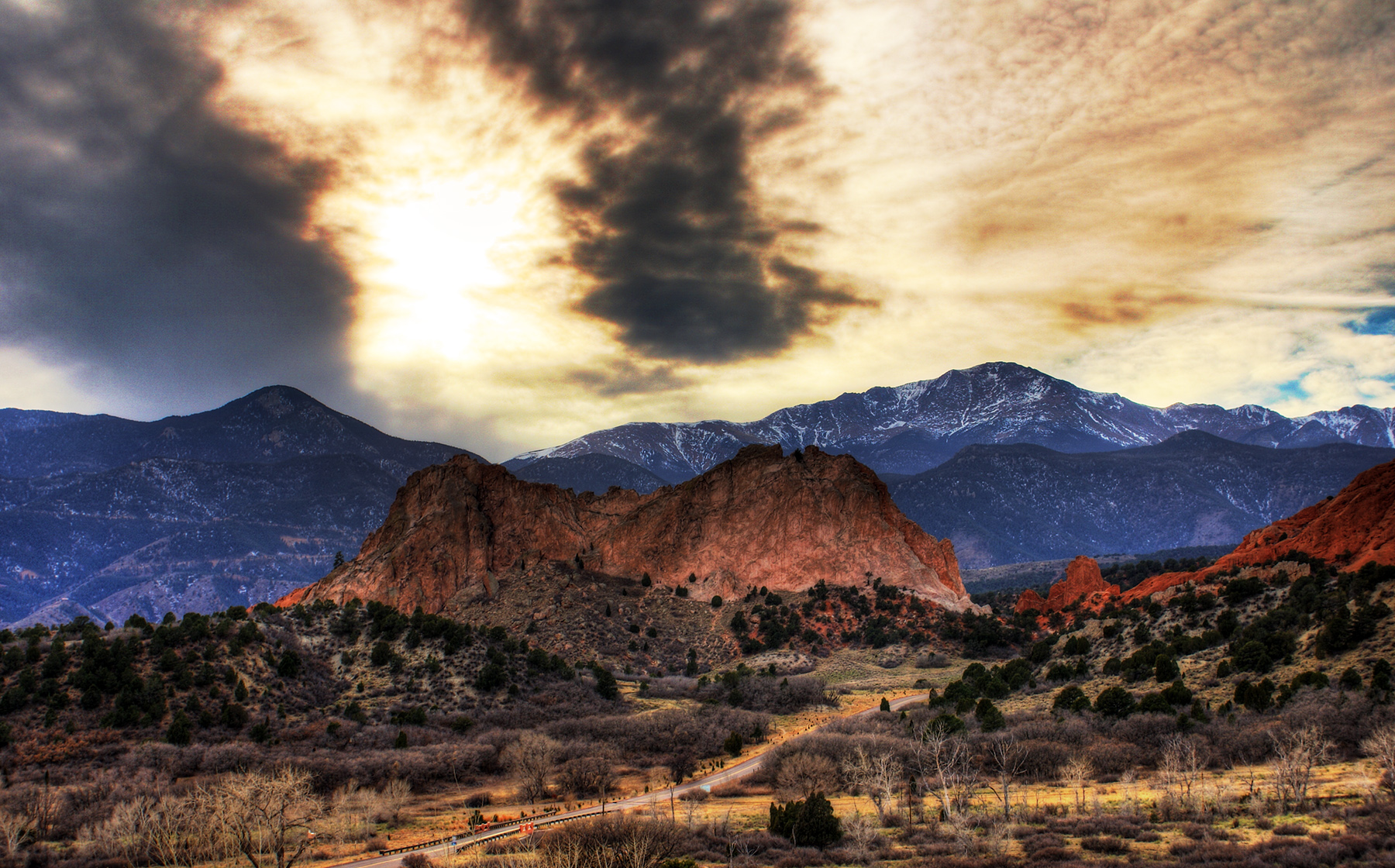
Garden of the Gods at dawn

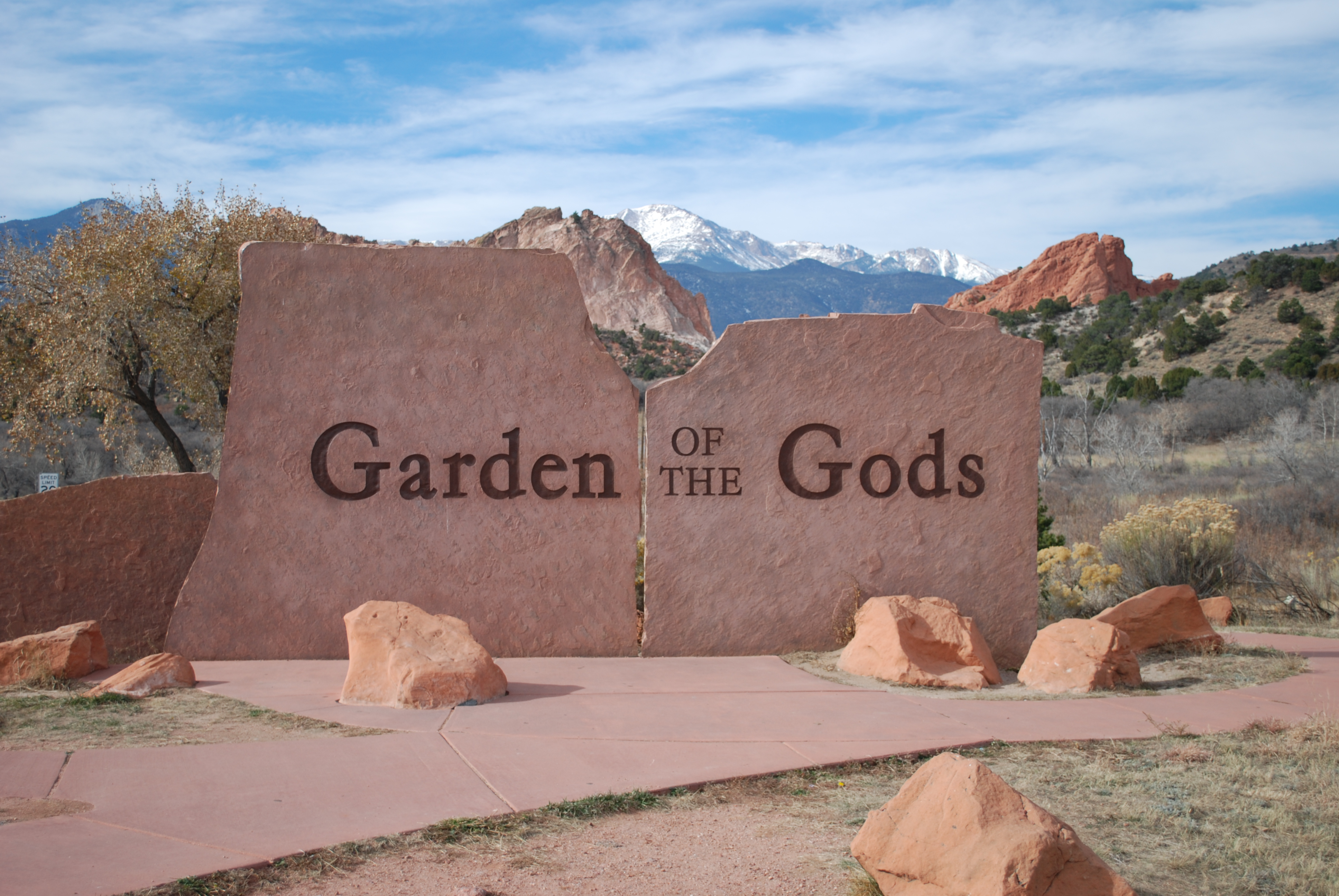
The entrance to Garden of the Gods with Pikes Peak in the background

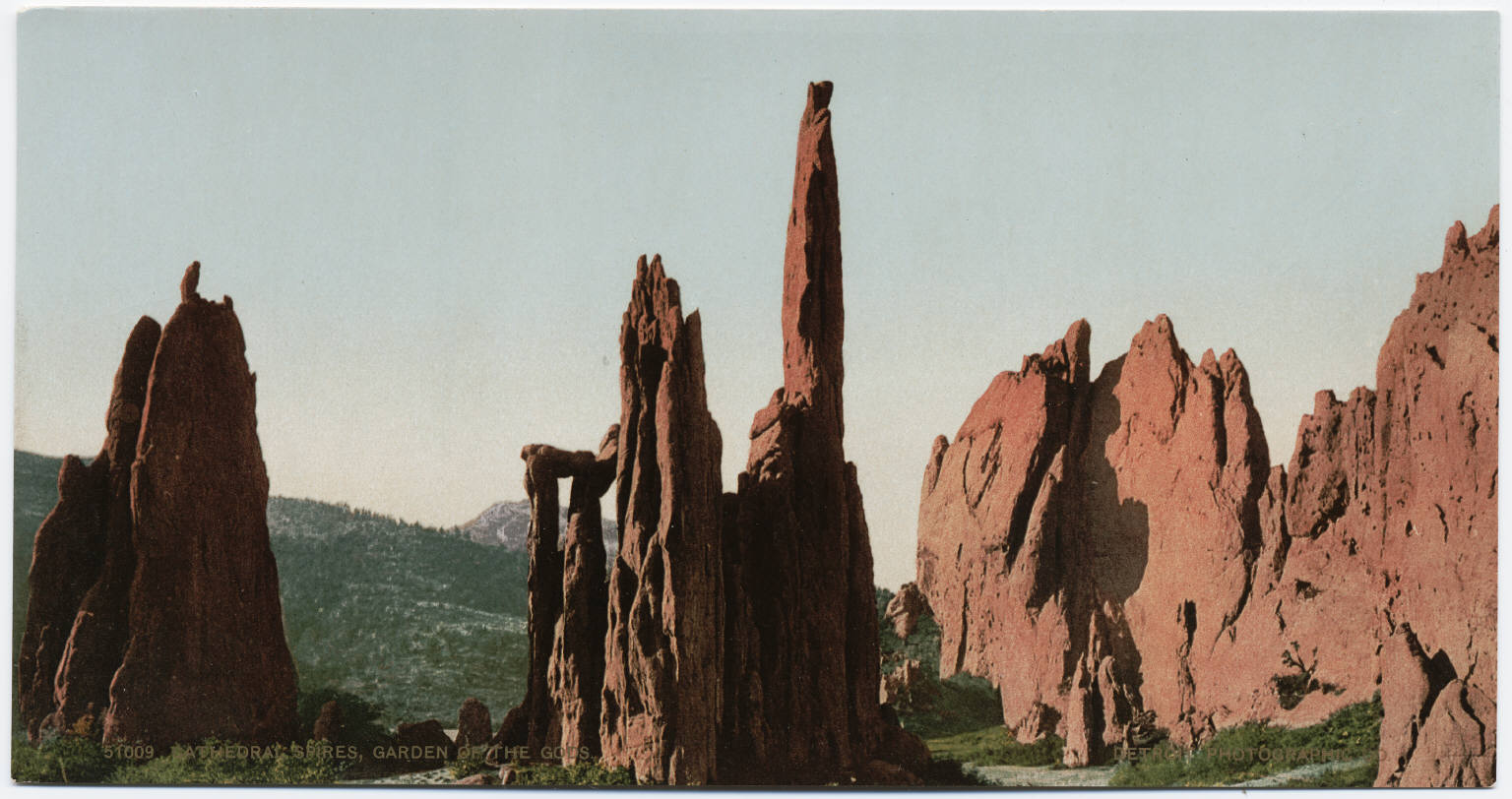
Photochrom of the Cathedral Spires (center), c. 1900

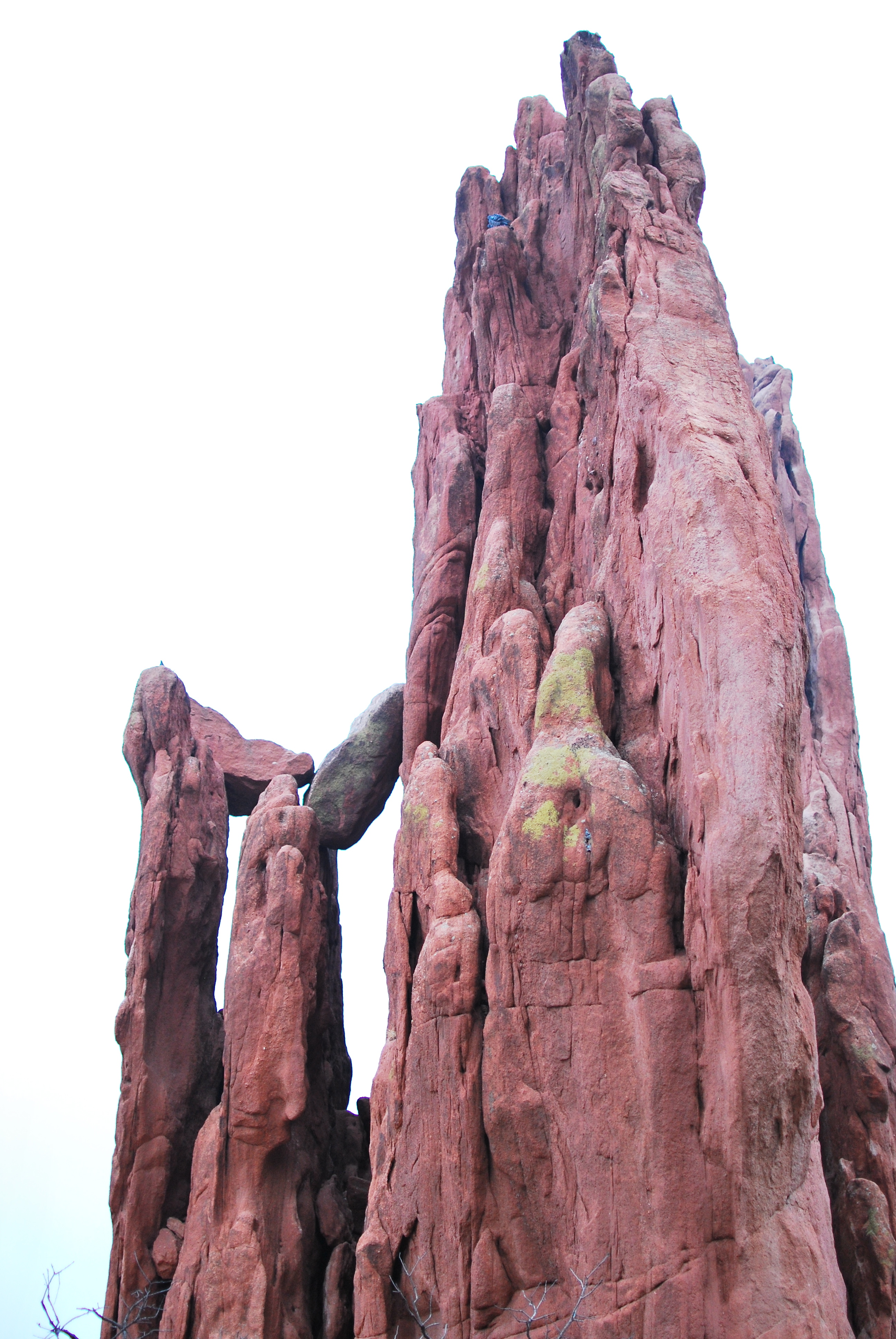
A segment of the Cathedral Spires, March 2010

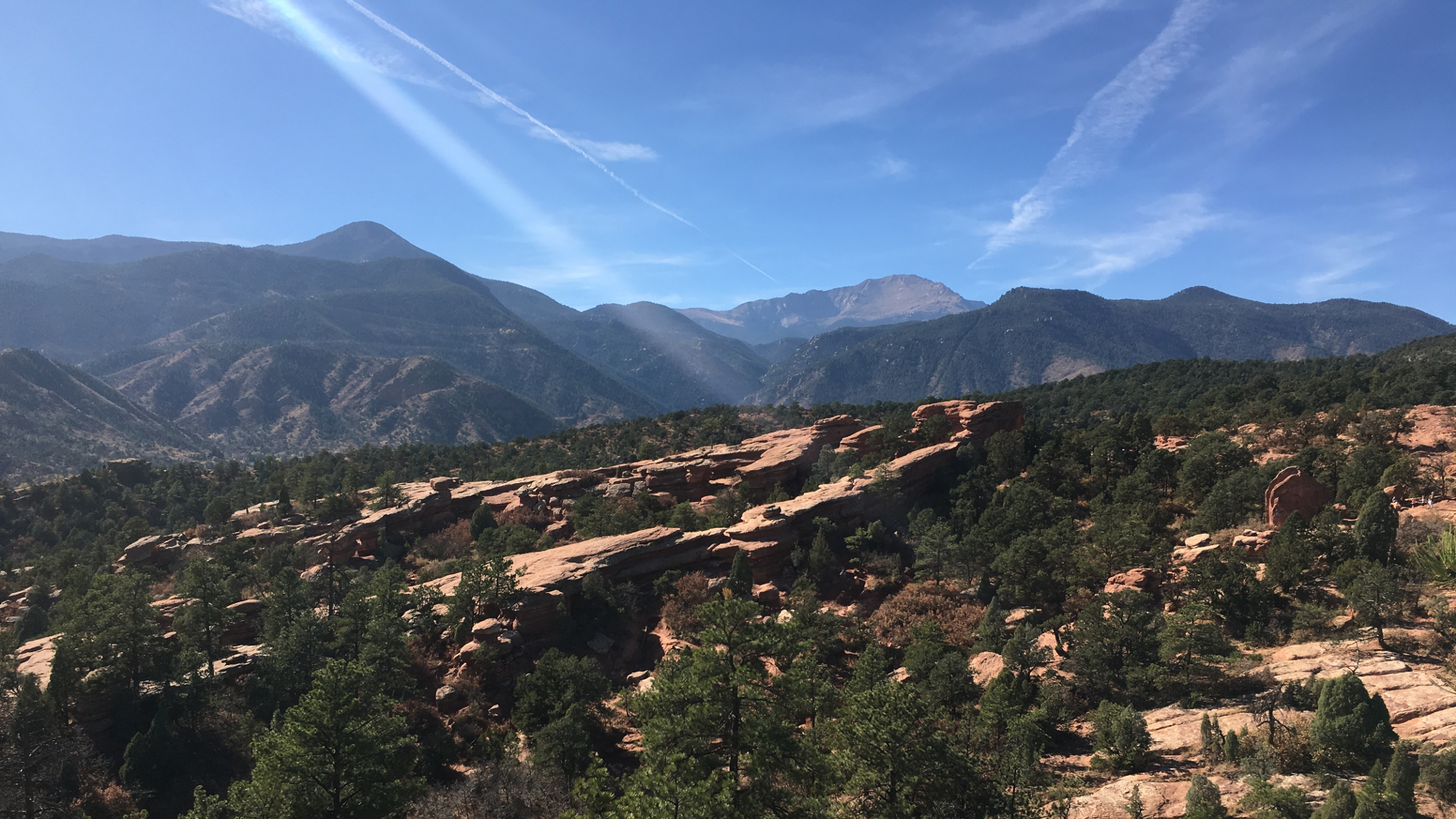
Looking west from the southern entrance, October 2016

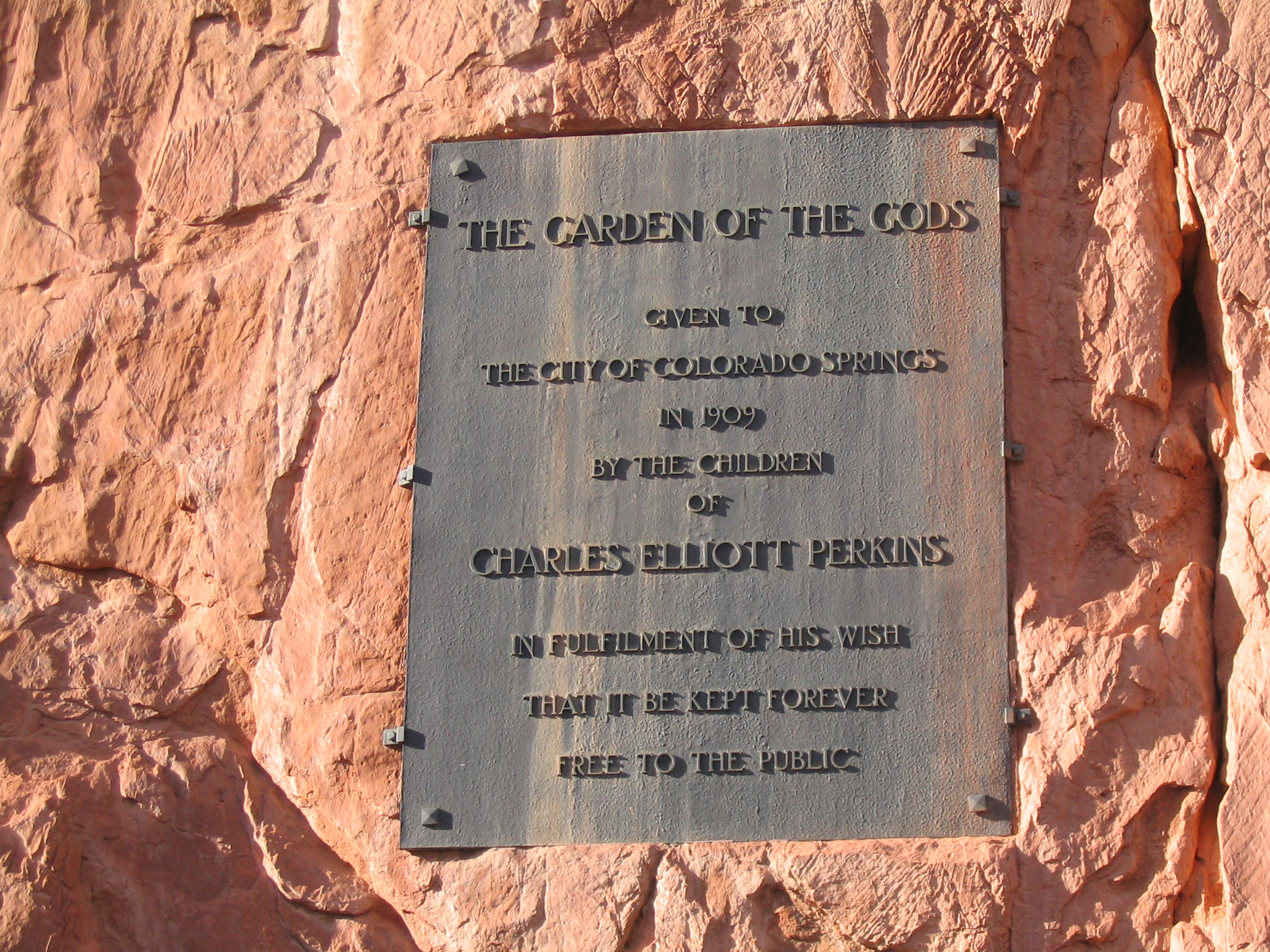
Dedication plaque

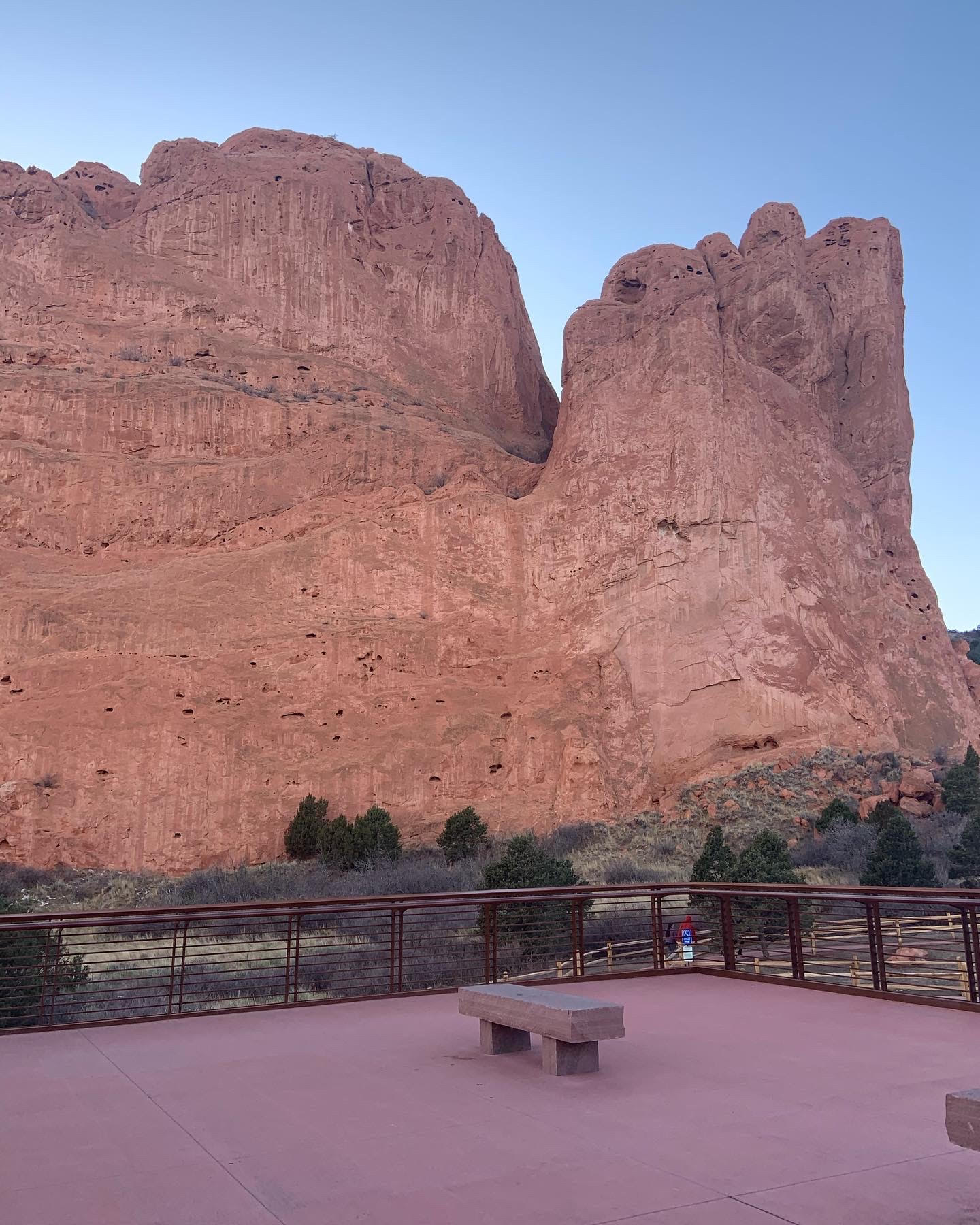
Seating area

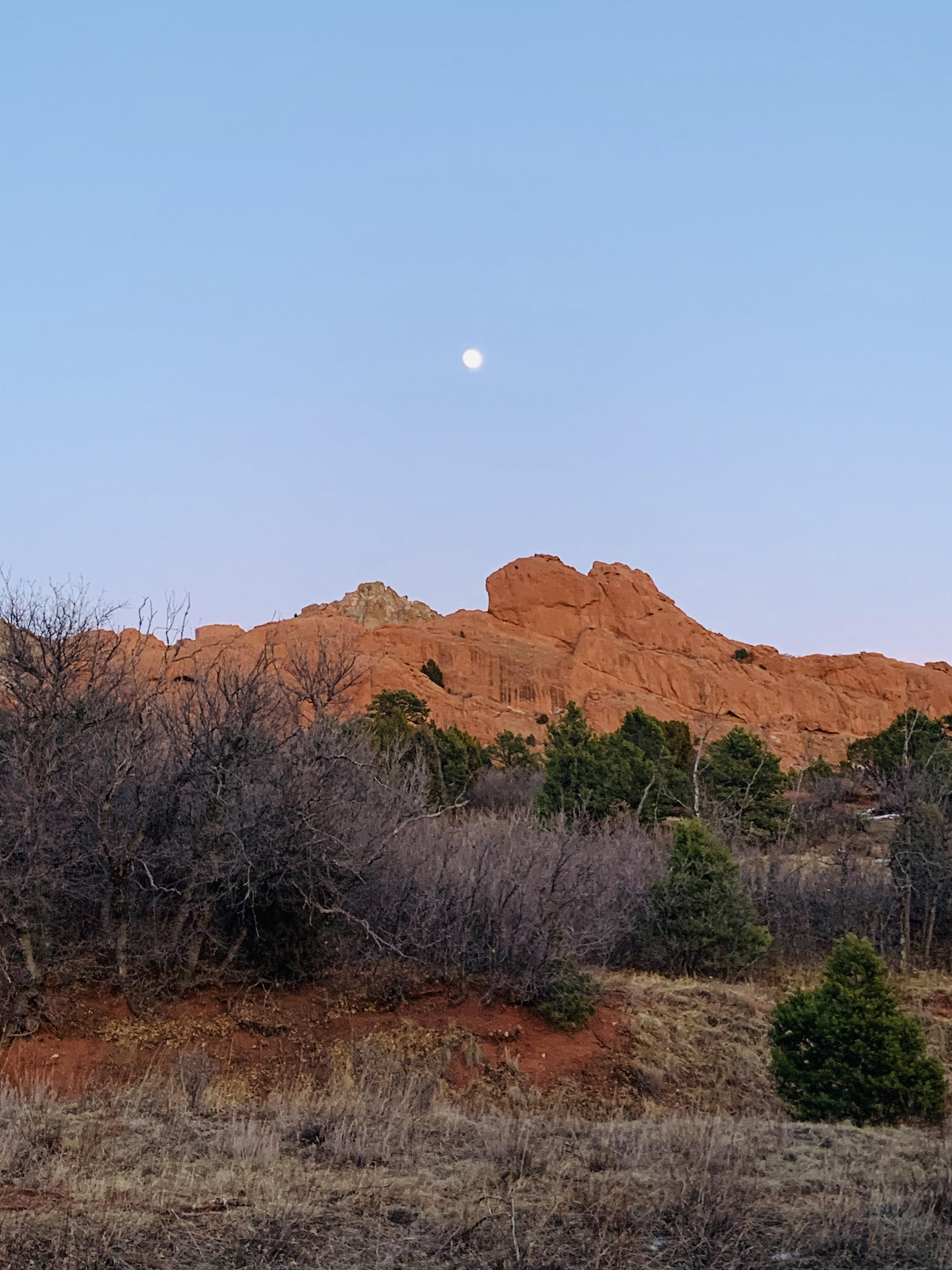
The rock formations with full moon, January 2020

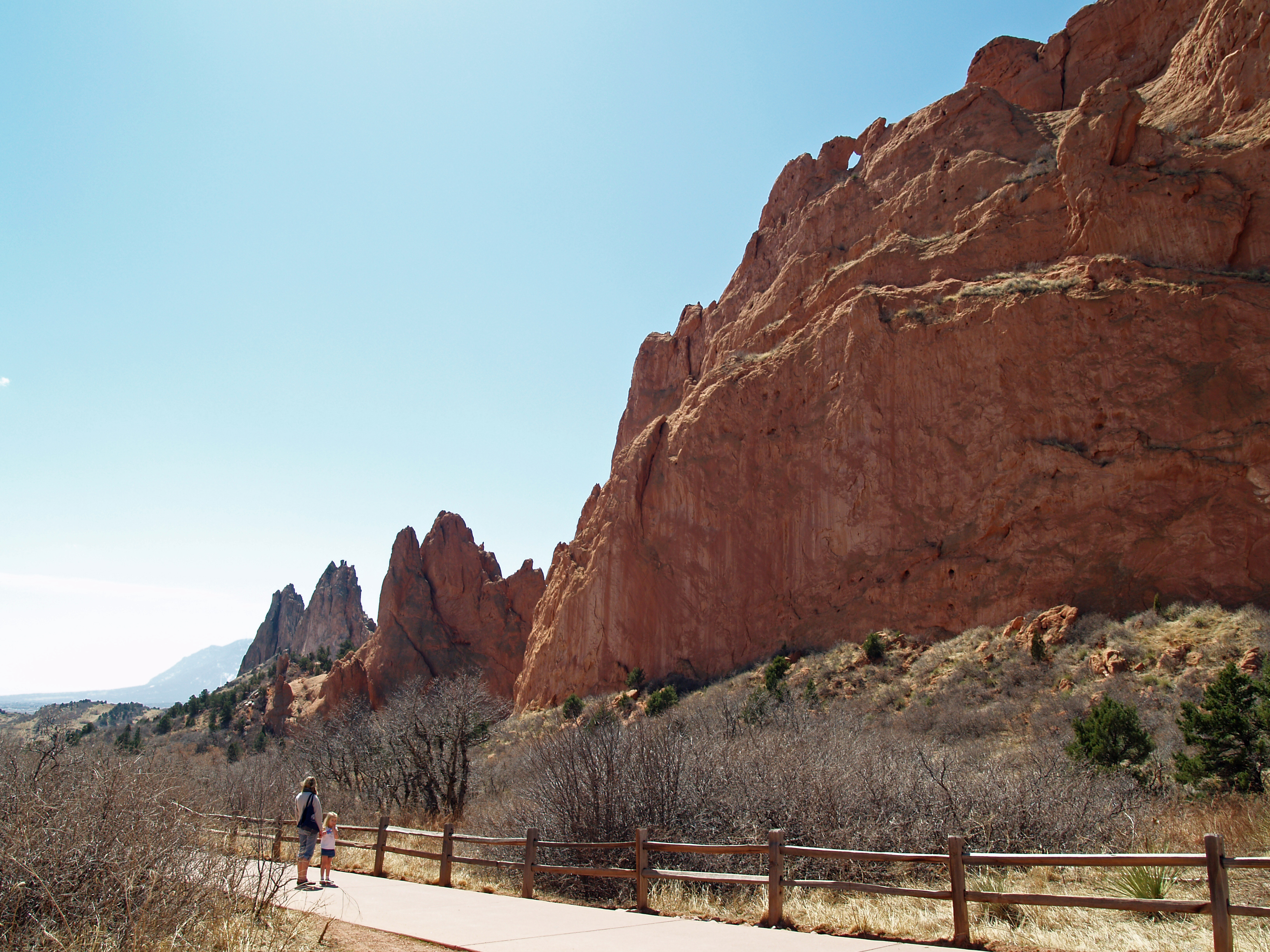
A row of hogbacks. The Kissing Camels formation is atop the nearest hogback on the right.

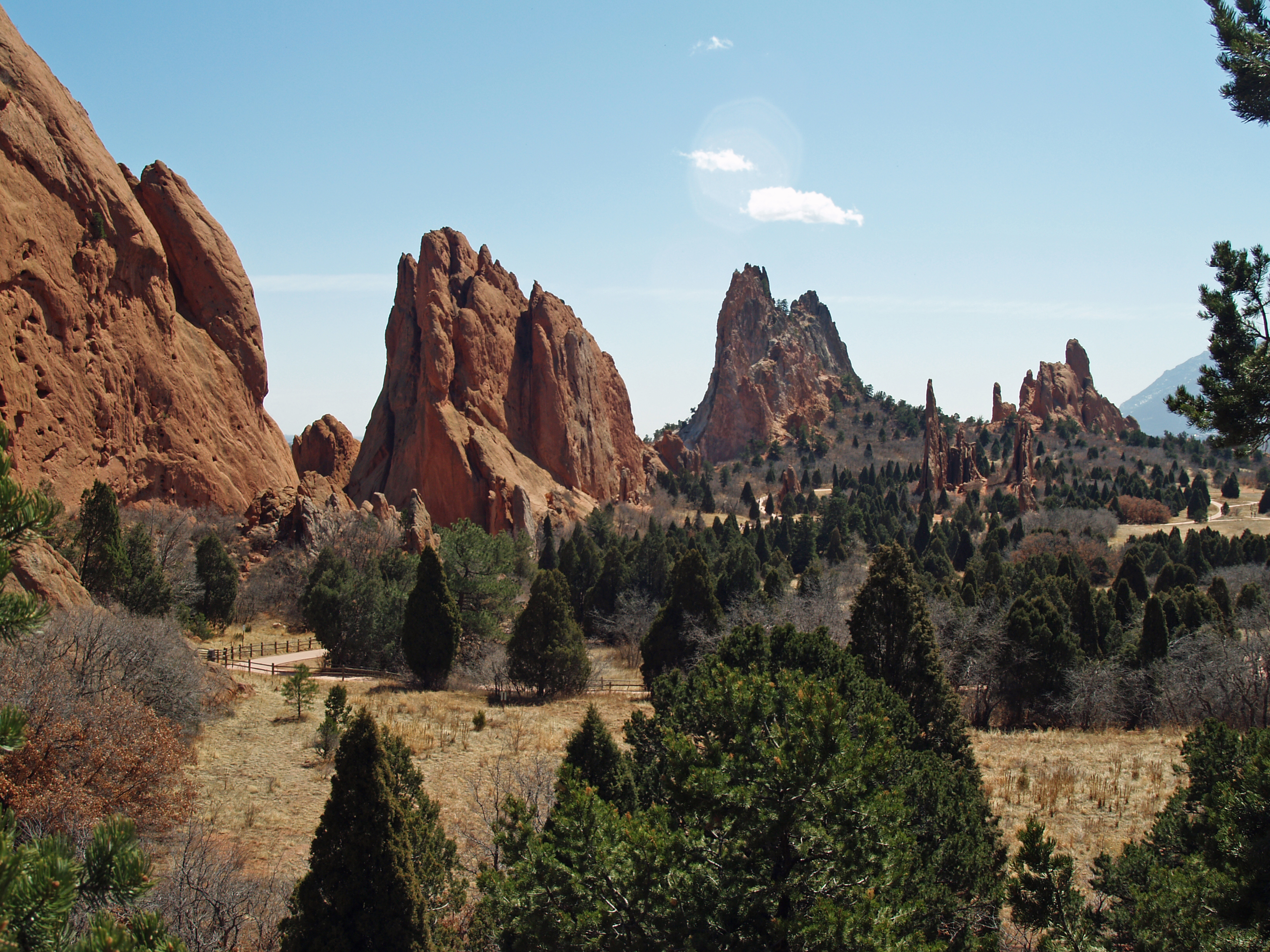
A view of Cathedral Valley showing some of its unusual hogback formations

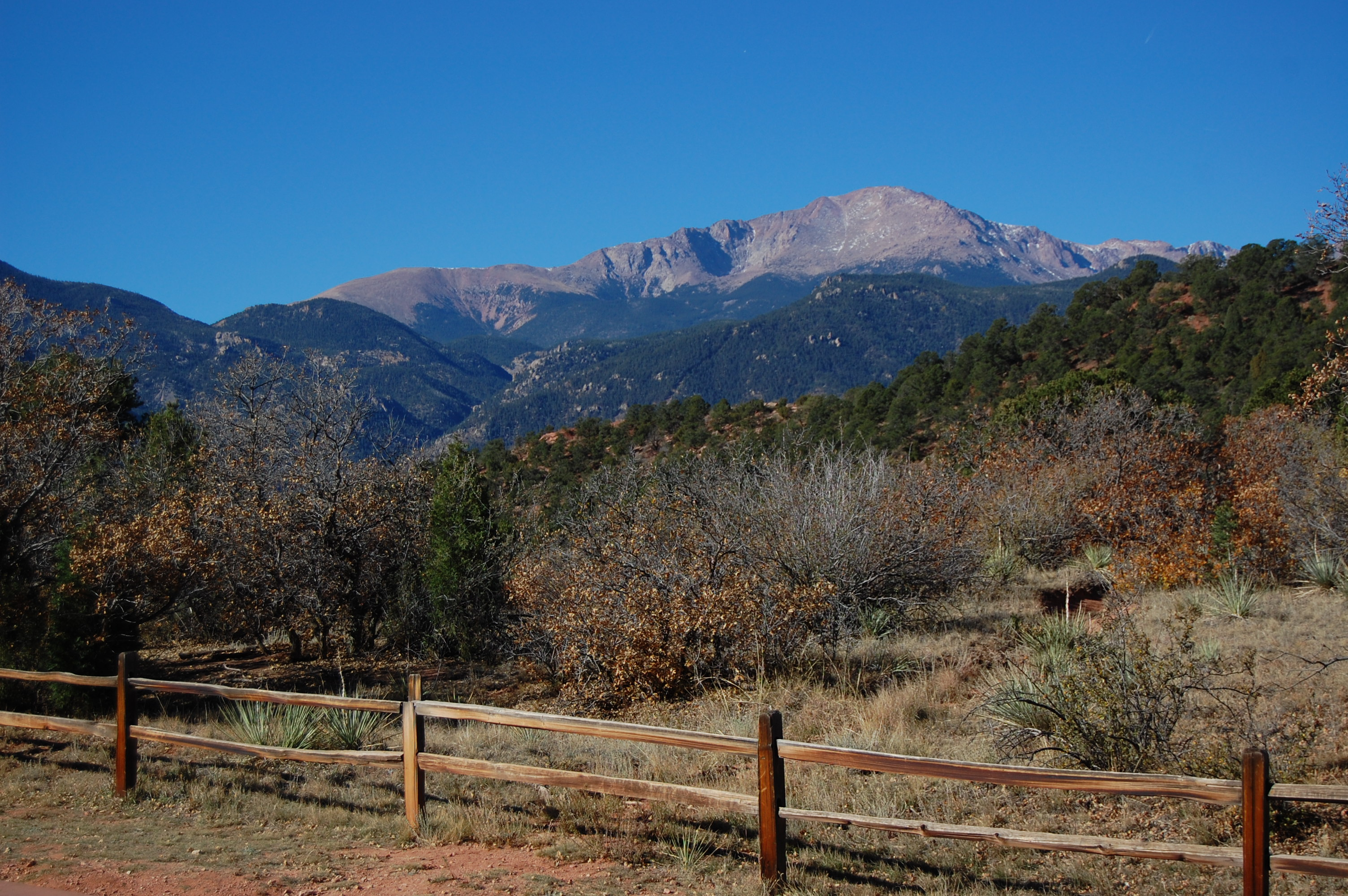
A view of Pikes Peak from Garden of the Gods

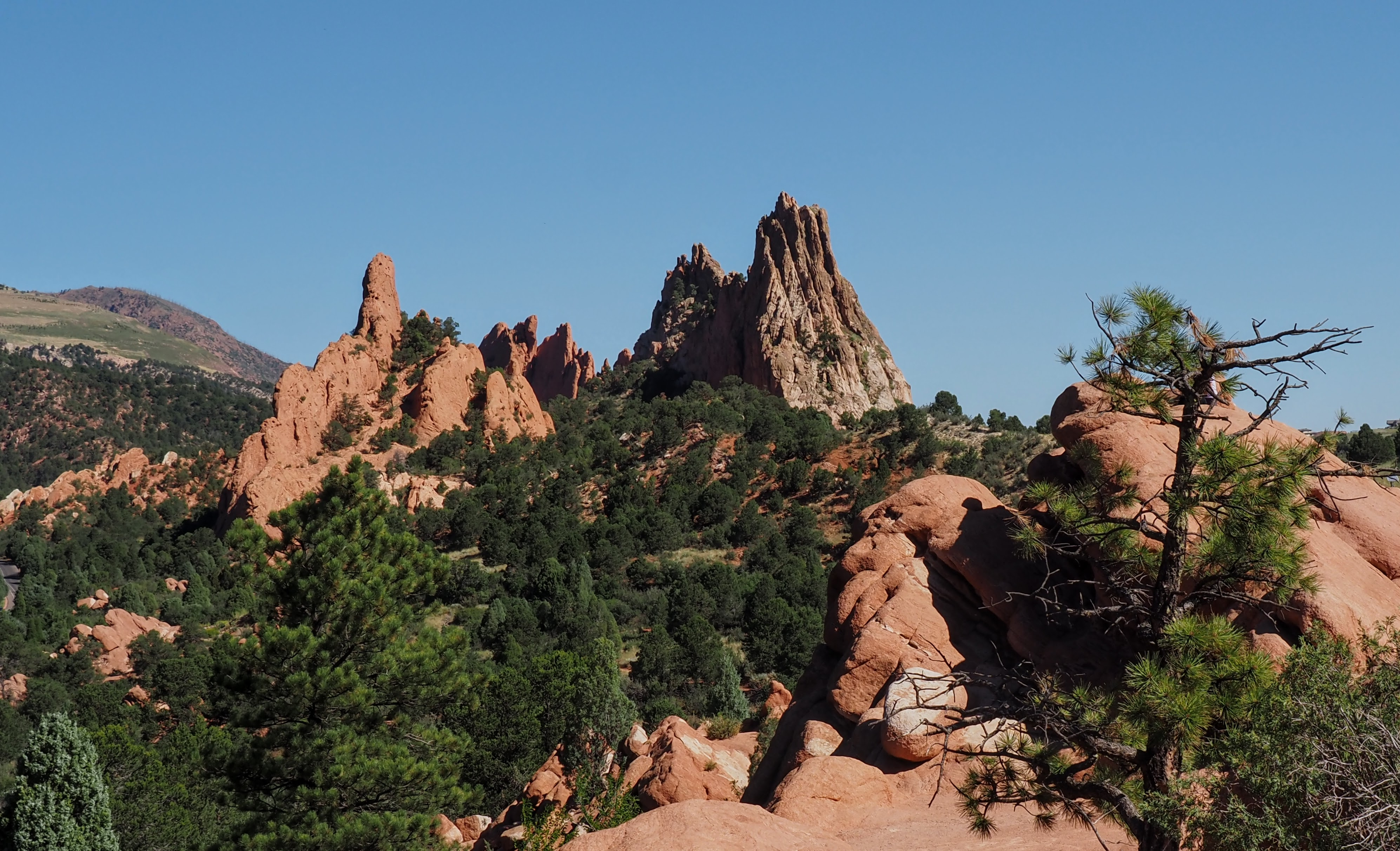
End-on view of hogbacks from the south, resembling a finger (left) and praying hands (right)

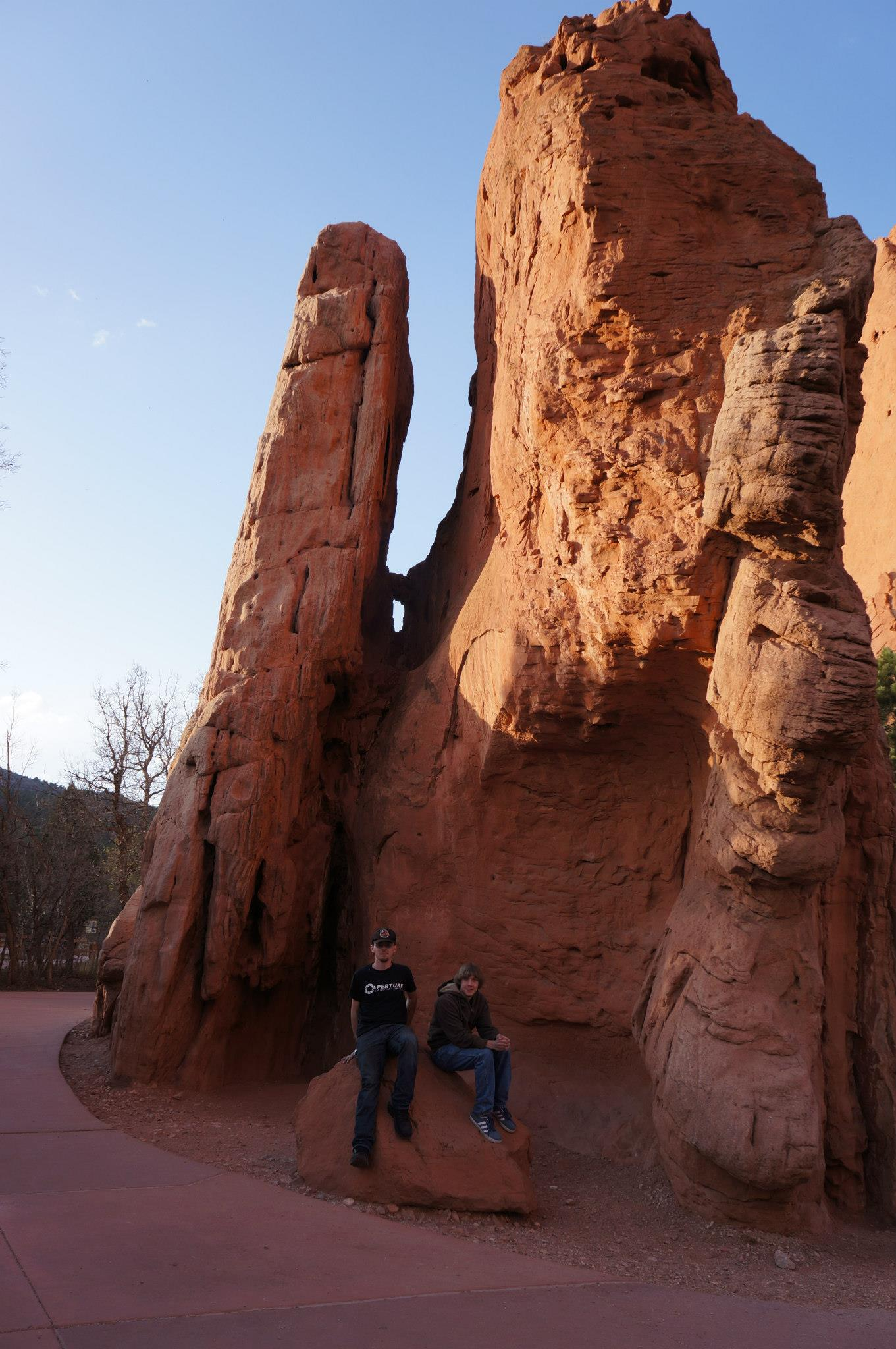
Sentinel Spires, a popular tourist attraction in Garden of the Gods

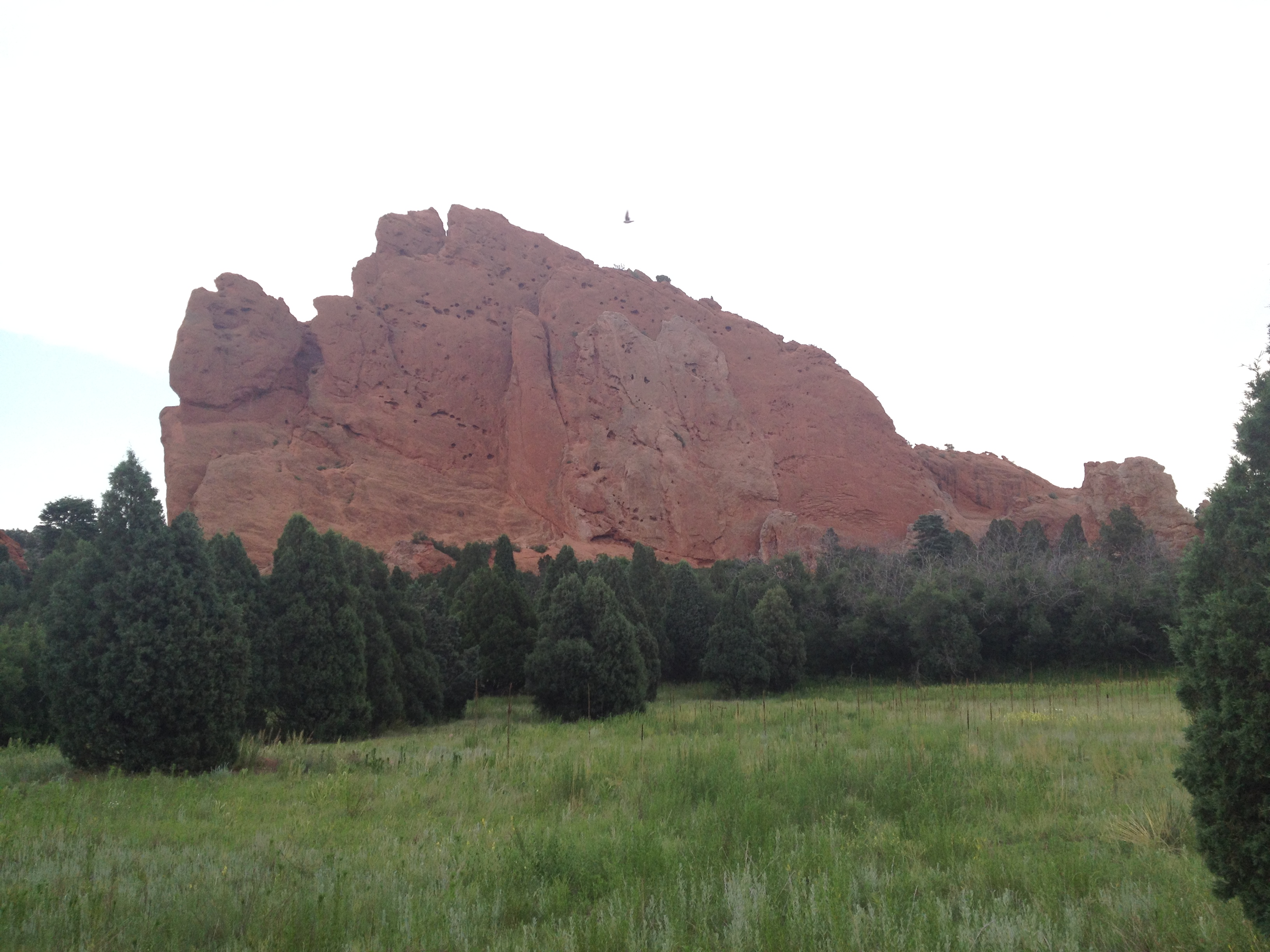
A view of South Gateway Rock at the Garden of the Gods

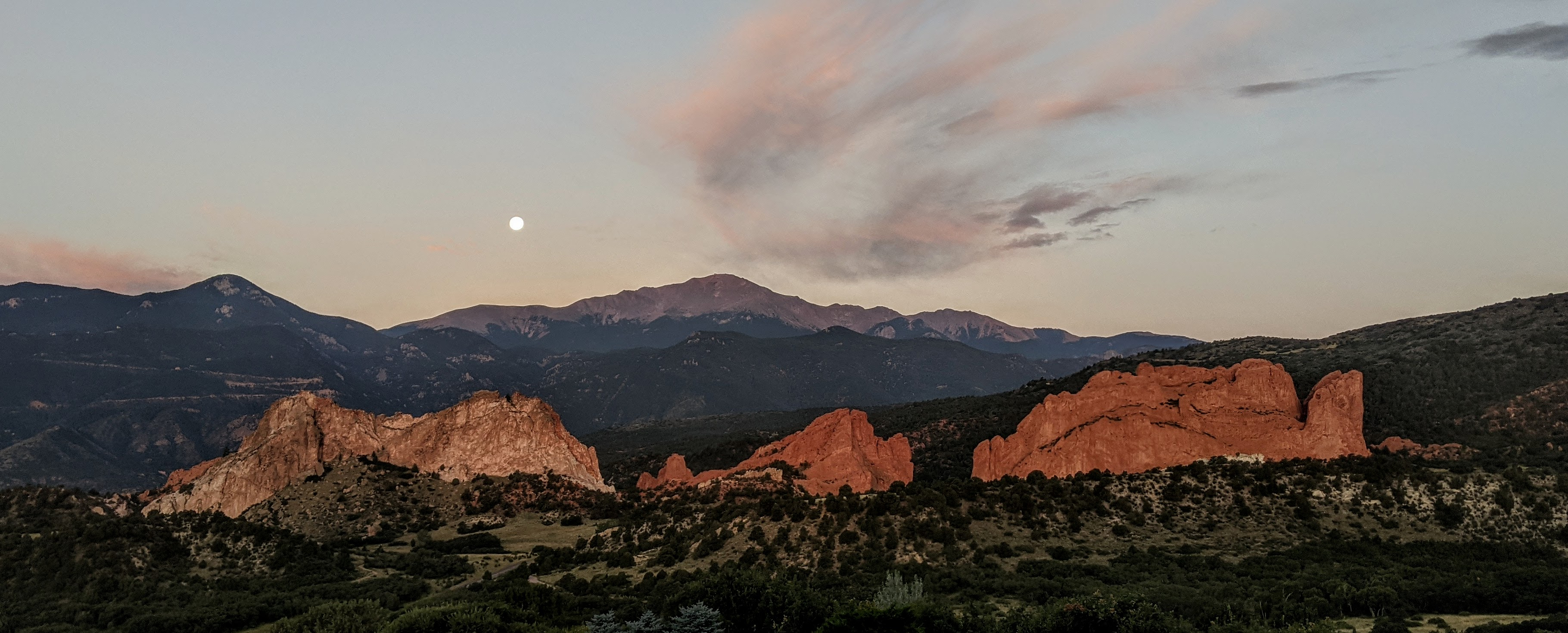
Garden of the Gods near sunrise, approaching the setting of the seasonal blue moon behind Pikes Peak, August 2021

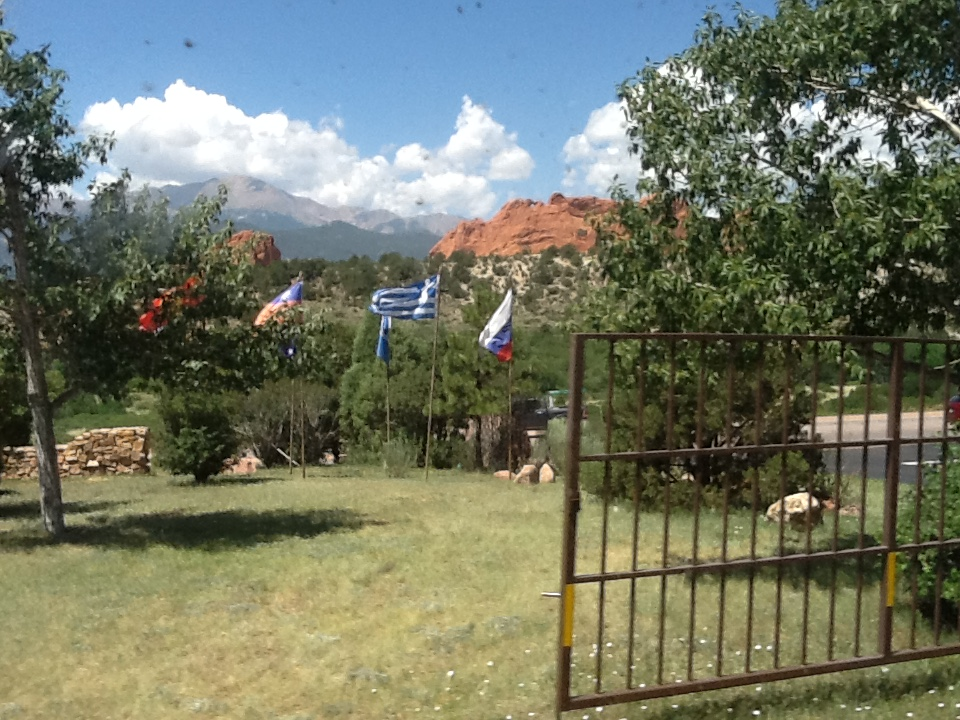
A circle of flags at the entrance to Garden of the Gods in Colorado, Springs, Colorado. The flags of Russia, Greece, and the Republic of China are visible in the foreground, just downhill from the gates to the parking lot.

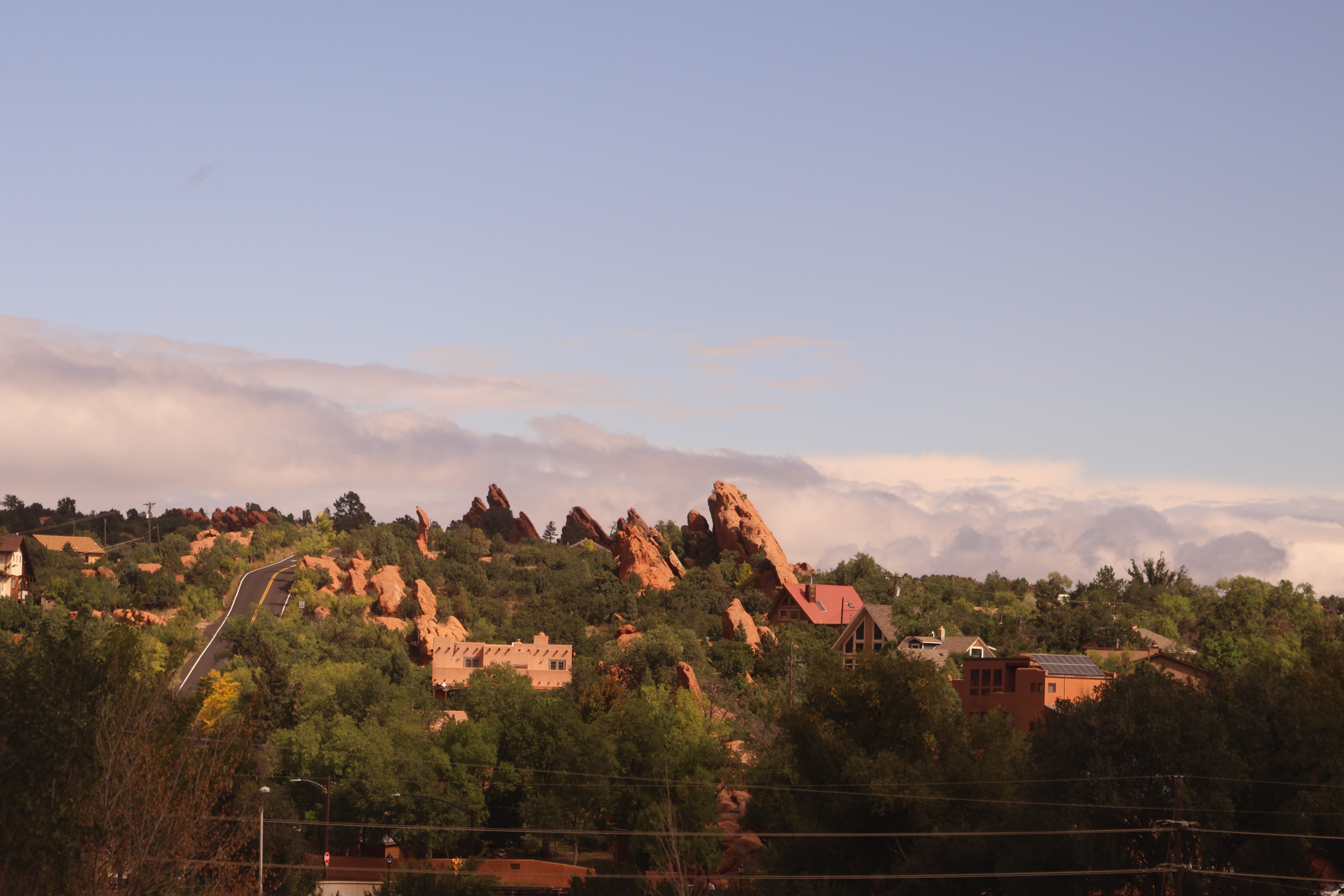
View near the Guardian of the Gods

== See also ==
- Garden of the Gods Trading Post, adjacent to south side of the Garden of the Gods Park
- Rock Ledge Ranch Historic Site, immediately adjacent to Garden of the Gods
