= Steamboat Rock (Garden of the Gods) =

Rock formation

Steamboat Rock, Garden of the Gods
- IUCN category III (natural monument or feature)
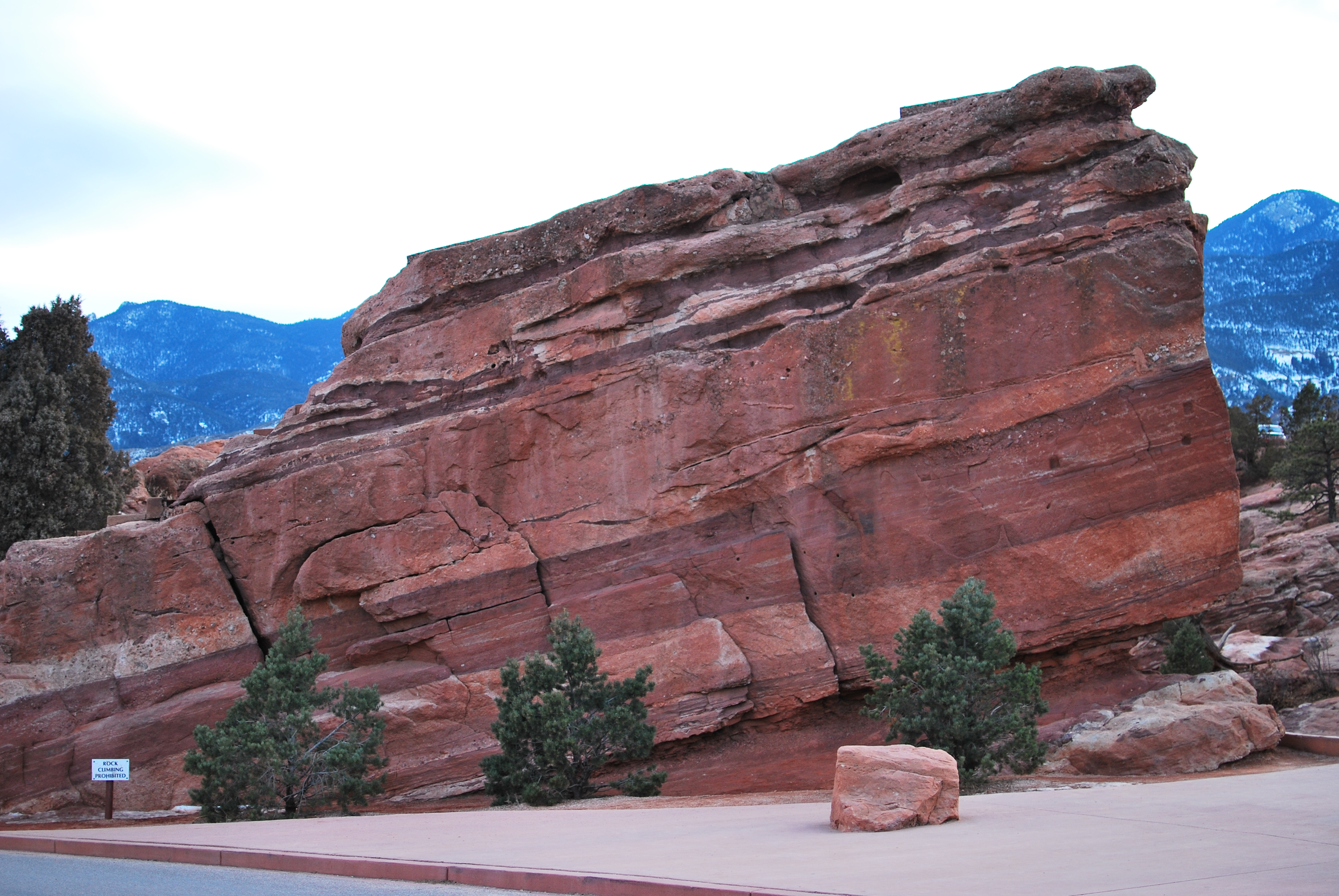
- Steamboat Rock, Garden of the Gods, Colorado Springs, Colorado
- Interactive map of Steamboat Rock, Garden of the Gods
- Location: El Paso County, Colorado, USA
- Nearest city: Colorado Springs, Colorado
- Coordinates: 38°51′53″N 104°53′50″W
- Governing body: Colorado Springs, Colorado

Steamboat Rock is a rock formation in the Garden of the Gods in Colorado Springs, Colorado. It is easily accessible by paved road and is a popular spot for tourist photography. The rock was once privately owned, and tourists climbed upon the rock for photographs of it and nearby Balanced Rock. Climbing upon the rock is now prohibited. While the handrails were removed in the 1970s, the stairs leading up the spine of the formation are still visible.

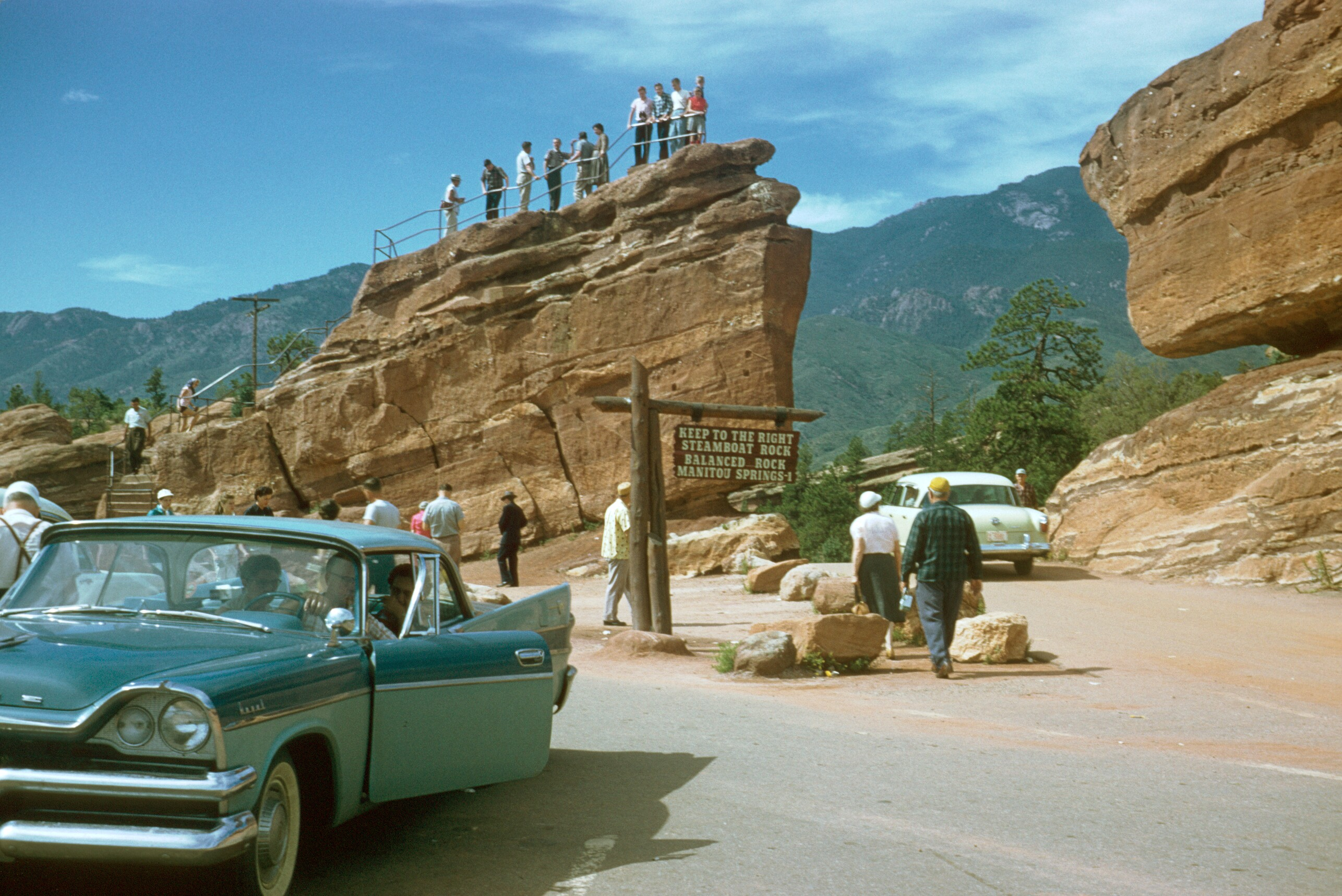
Steamboat Rock in the 1950s when tourists were allowed to climb on the rock

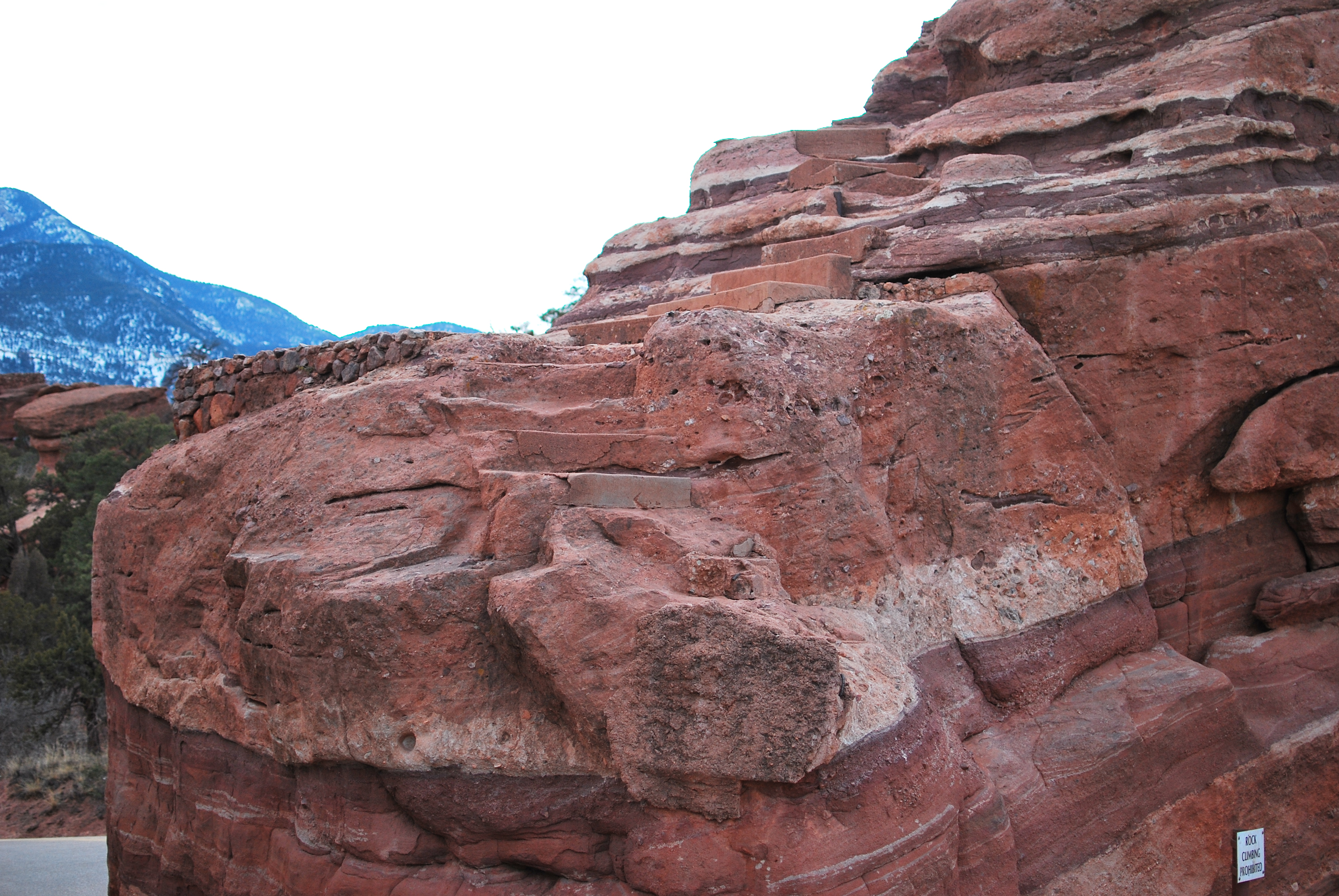
Steps on the rock where tourists used to be allowed to climb

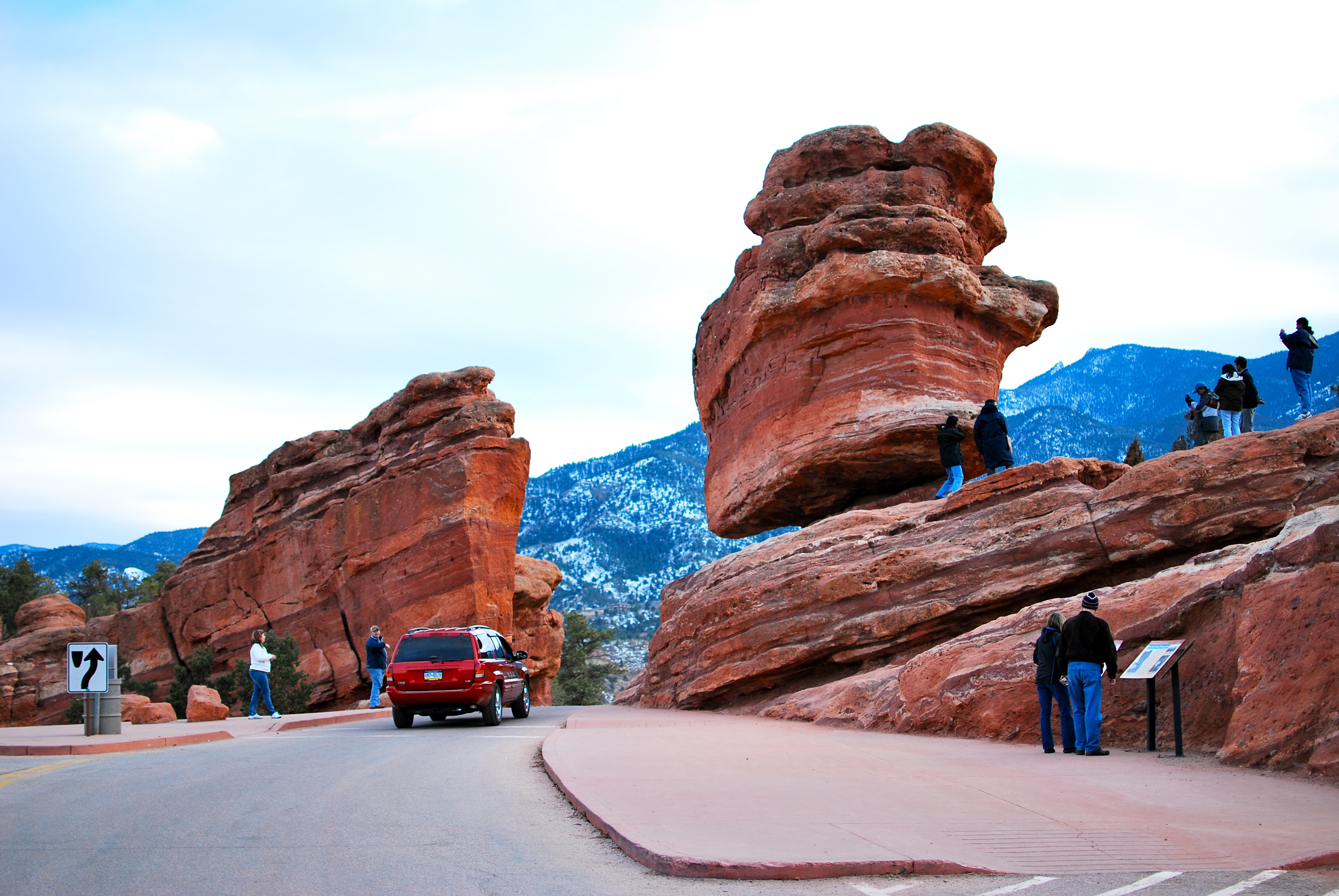
Steamboat and Balanced Rocks together are a popular photography location for tourists
