= Parks in Colorado Springs, Colorado =

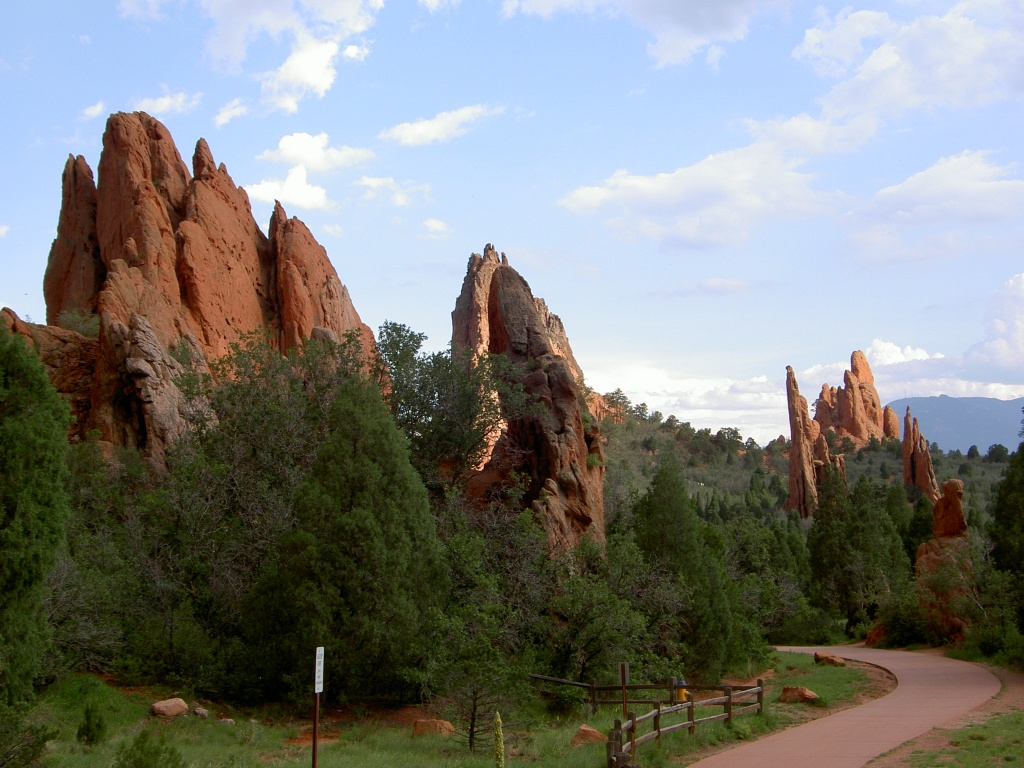
Garden of the Gods

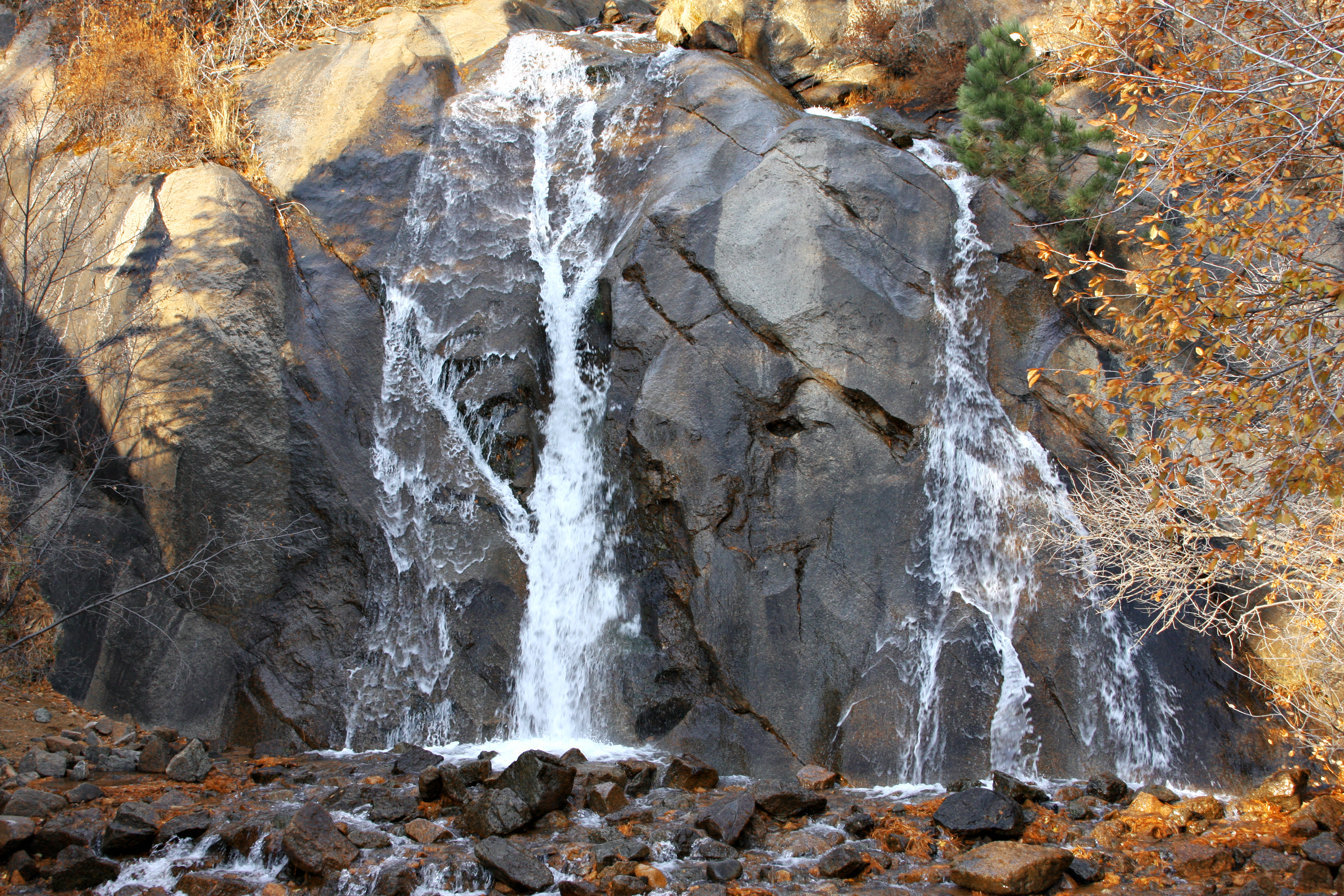
Helen Hunt Falls, North Cheyenne Cañon Park

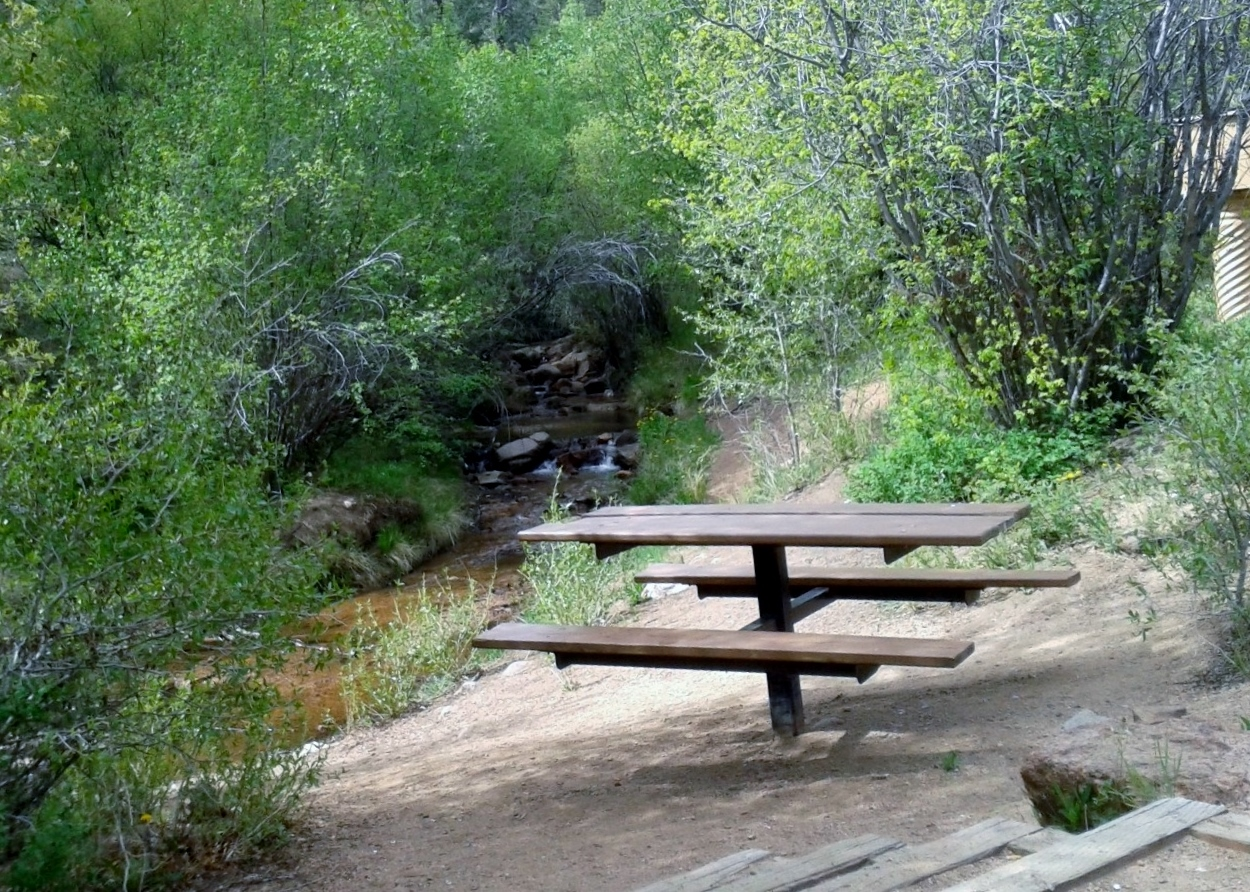
Bear Creek Cañon Park - Bear Creek and Picnic Area

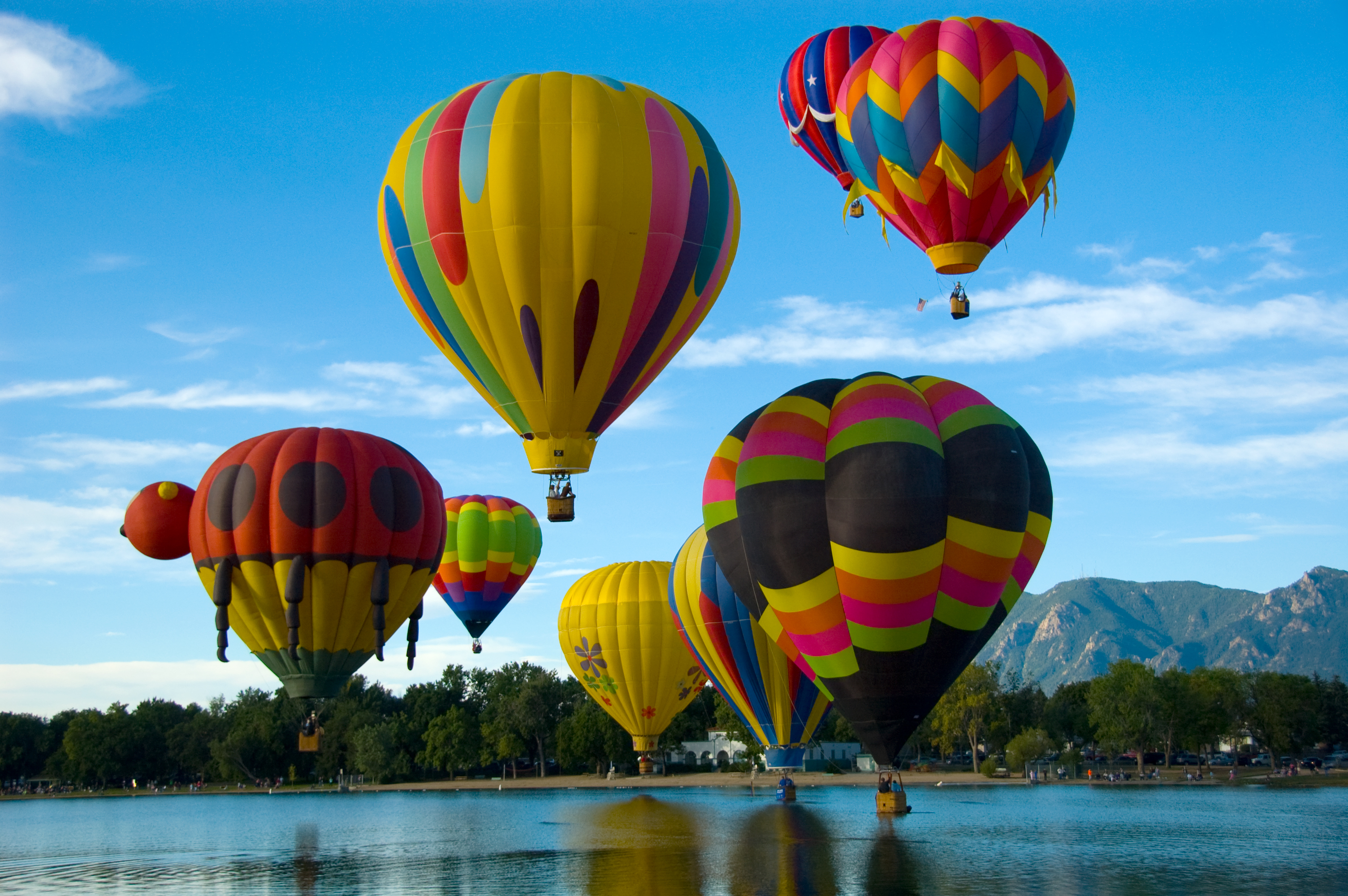
Colorado Balloon Classic, Colorado Springs Hot Air Balloon Competition, Memorial Park

There are a wide range of recreational areas and facilities in Colorado Springs, Colorado, United States.

== History ==
The first city park in Colorado Springs, included in the initial town plans in 1871, is Acacia Park. It was initially called Acacia Square or North Park. General William Jackson Palmer donated land to establish Acacia and additional parks, including: Antlers Park, Monument Valley Park, North Cheyenne Cañon, Palmer Park, Pioneer Square Park (South Park), Prospect Lake and Bear Creek Cañon Park. He donated a total of 1,270 acres (510 ha) of land, some of which was also used for scenic drives, tree-lined roadways and foot and bridle paths. The Perkins heirs donated Garden of the Gods to the city in 1909.

== Types of parks ==
=== State park ===
The largest park in El Paso County is the 1,680-acre (680 ha) Cheyenne Mountain State Park, which is located in the southern end of Colorado Springs. Its terrain varies from prairie grassland and scrub oak to Douglas fir and ponderosa pine on the peaks at the western side of the park. Throughout the year it offers camping and picnic, 16 miles (26 km) of hiking and biking trails, and viewing of wildlife, such as red fox, black bear, deer, elk, and mountain lions. There is a visitor center where visitors may learn about park programs and activities. The park has facilities for group events.

=== City parks ===
The City of Colorado Springs has community, regional and neighborhood parks.

- Neighborhood parks are up to 6 acres (2.4 ha) in size and may offer a combination of playgrounds, picnic areas, walking paths, and sports fields or courts. There are 135 neighborhood parks, totaling 903.9 acres (365.8 ha) as of May, 2013.
- Community parks may range from 35 acres (14 ha) to 175 acres (71 ha) and offer larger facilities for sports activities, such as skateboarding, in-line hockey, multi-use fields and other sports facilities. There may be picnic areas, reservable pavilions for large group picnics, and gardens. As of May, 2013, there were 700 acres (280 ha) of community parks, which includes among others Memorial Park and Monument Valley Park.
- Regional parks are generally more than 100 acres (40 ha) which offer outdoor recreation, educational programs, picnic areas and protect the natural resources of the park. The city's regional parks total 7,390.6 acres (2,990.9 ha) as of May, 2013. Regional parks include Garden of the Gods, Bear Creek Cañon Park, North Cheyenne Cañon Park, Ute Valley Park and Palmer Park. The North Slope Recreation Area is located along Pikes Peak Highway. Jimmy Camp Creek Park (Jimmy's Camp) is an undeveloped park on East U.S. Highway 24.

=== Open space ===
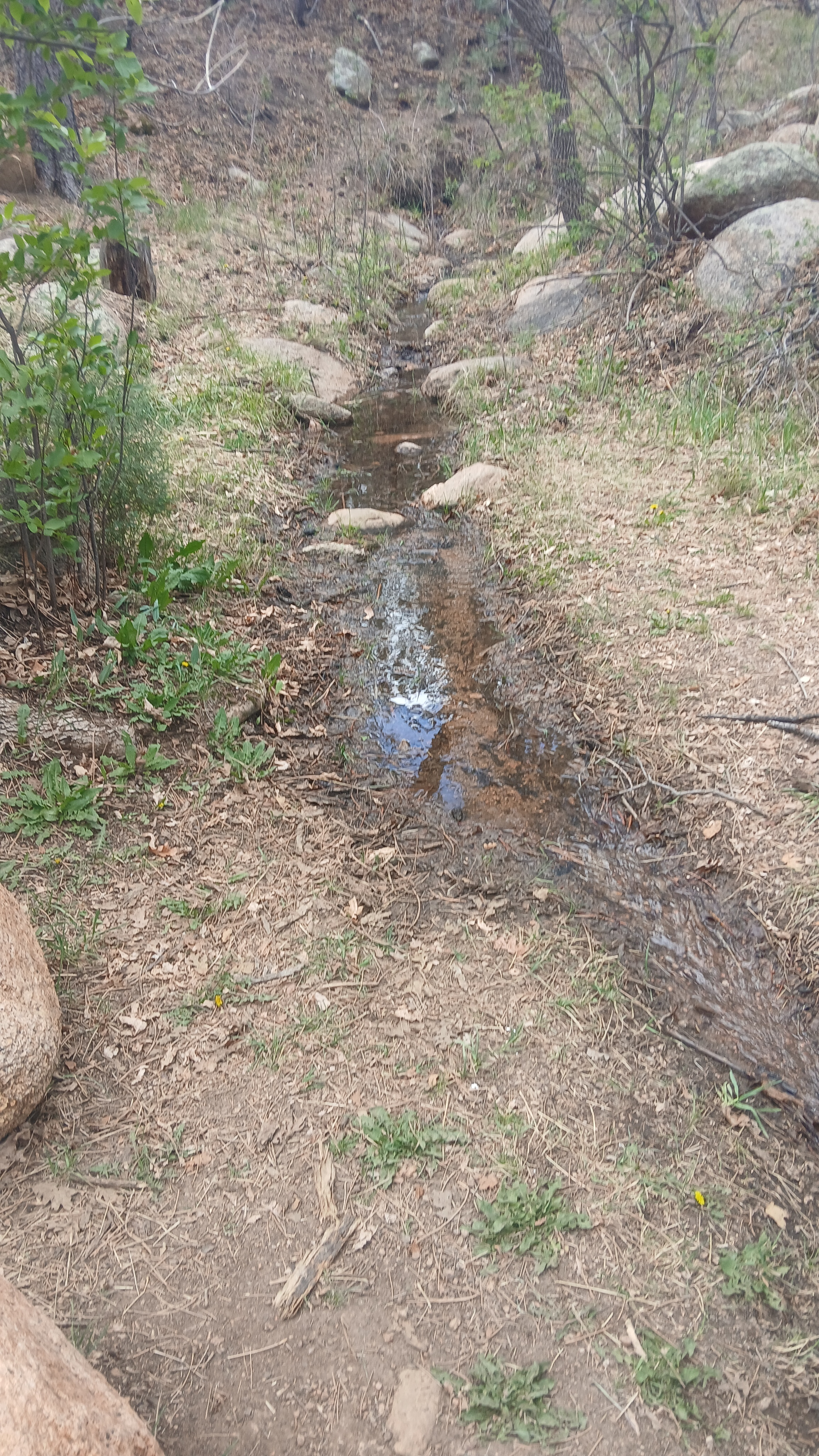
Stratton Open Space

There is a total of 4,702.3 acres (1,903.0 ha) of open space in Colorado Springs. The natural settings include rock formations, prairie grasslands, pine forests and hillsides and mountain foothills. Some of the key open space properties include Red Rock Canyon Open Space, Austin Bluffs Open Space, Stratton Open Space, Cheyenne Mountain State Park backdrop, and Blodgett Peak Open Space. Trails are frequently found in the open space. Some open space includes picnic areas; fishing, such as at Pikeview Reservoir #1; and wetlands at Sinton Pond Open Space. Catamount Institute at the Beidleman Environmental Center is located at Sondermann Park.

An additional total of 400-acre (160 ha) is used for Special Resource Areas, which are small open space properties throughout the city. They range from under 1-acre (0.40 ha) to 138.6 acres (56.1 ha) at the Stetson Hills Open Space.

Trails and Open Space Coalition is an organization whose mission includes "the conservation and preservation of open space in Colorado Springs." Individuals may volunteer for projects such as recovery from the Waldo Canyon Fire or projects at specific trails or open space properties, such as Red Rock Canyon, Intemann Trail, Austin Bluffs Open Space or Palmer Park to name a few.

=== Sports complexes ===
Aside from the sports fields and courts at the city parks, there are also 20-acre (8.1 ha) or more sports complexes dedicated to sports programs. The facilities may include a combination of fields for baseball, softball, soccer and football; tennis courts; skateboard parks, in-line skating rinks, aquatic centers and recreation centers. Sports complexes include Four Diamond Sports Complex on N. Nevada, Gossage Sports Complex on Mark Dabling Boulevard, Sky View Sports Complex on Resnick Drive, El Pomar Youth Sports Center on Executive Circle and Leon Young Youth Baseball Complex on S. Chelton. There are also two undeveloped complexes, the Lawrence Ochs Sports Complex, on N. Powers Boulevard, and the Tutt site on Tutt Boulevard.

=== Nature centers ===
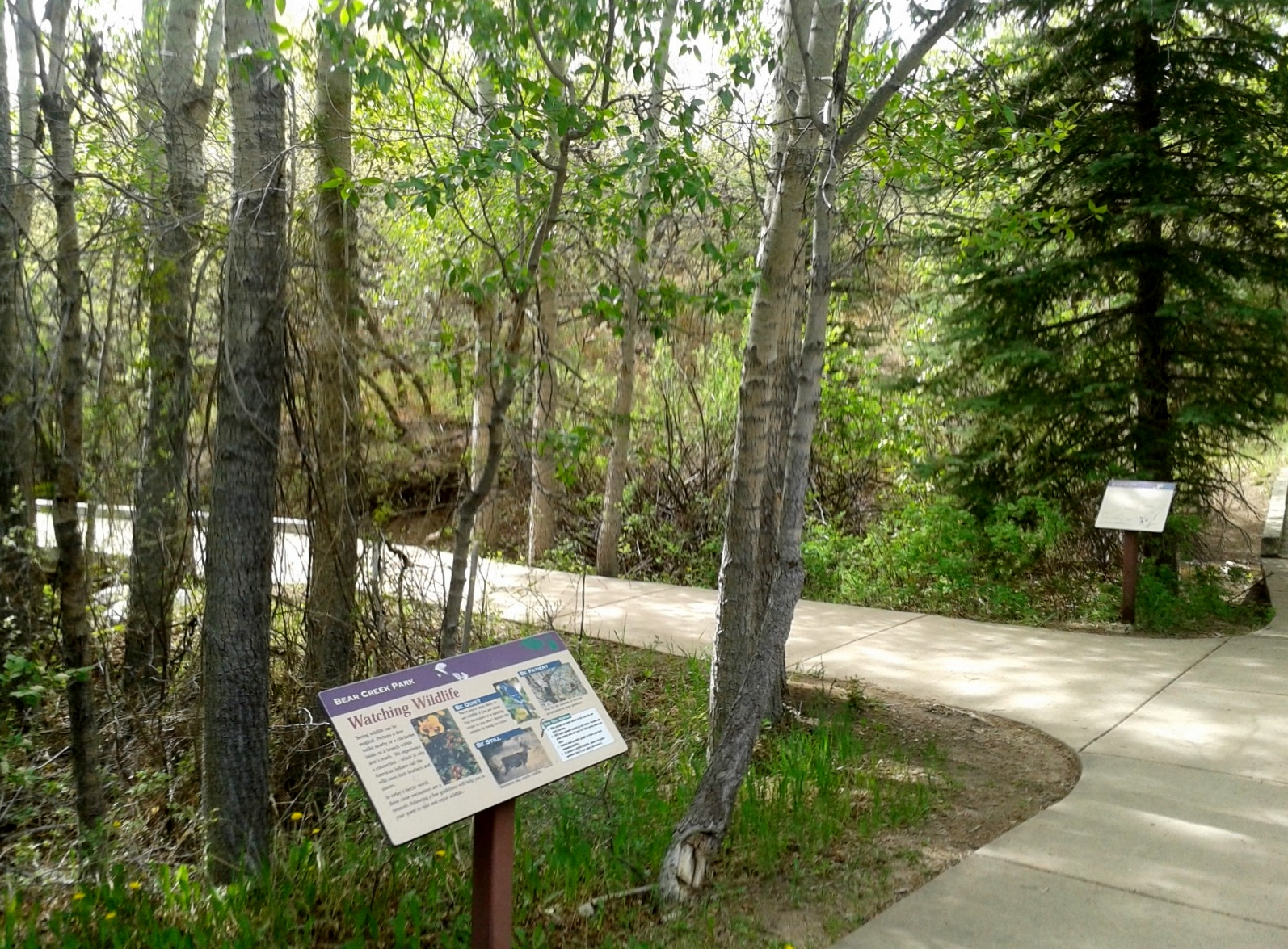
Bear Creek Nature Center trails

Bear Creek Regional Park's nature center offers self-guided and guided tours, interpretive programs, presentations, classes and special events. The nature center is free. Trails traverse a prairie landscape, foothills and up to the peaks. It is an El Paso County park, as is the Fountain Creek Nature Center, south of Colorado Springs in the city of Fountain.

=== Dog parks ===
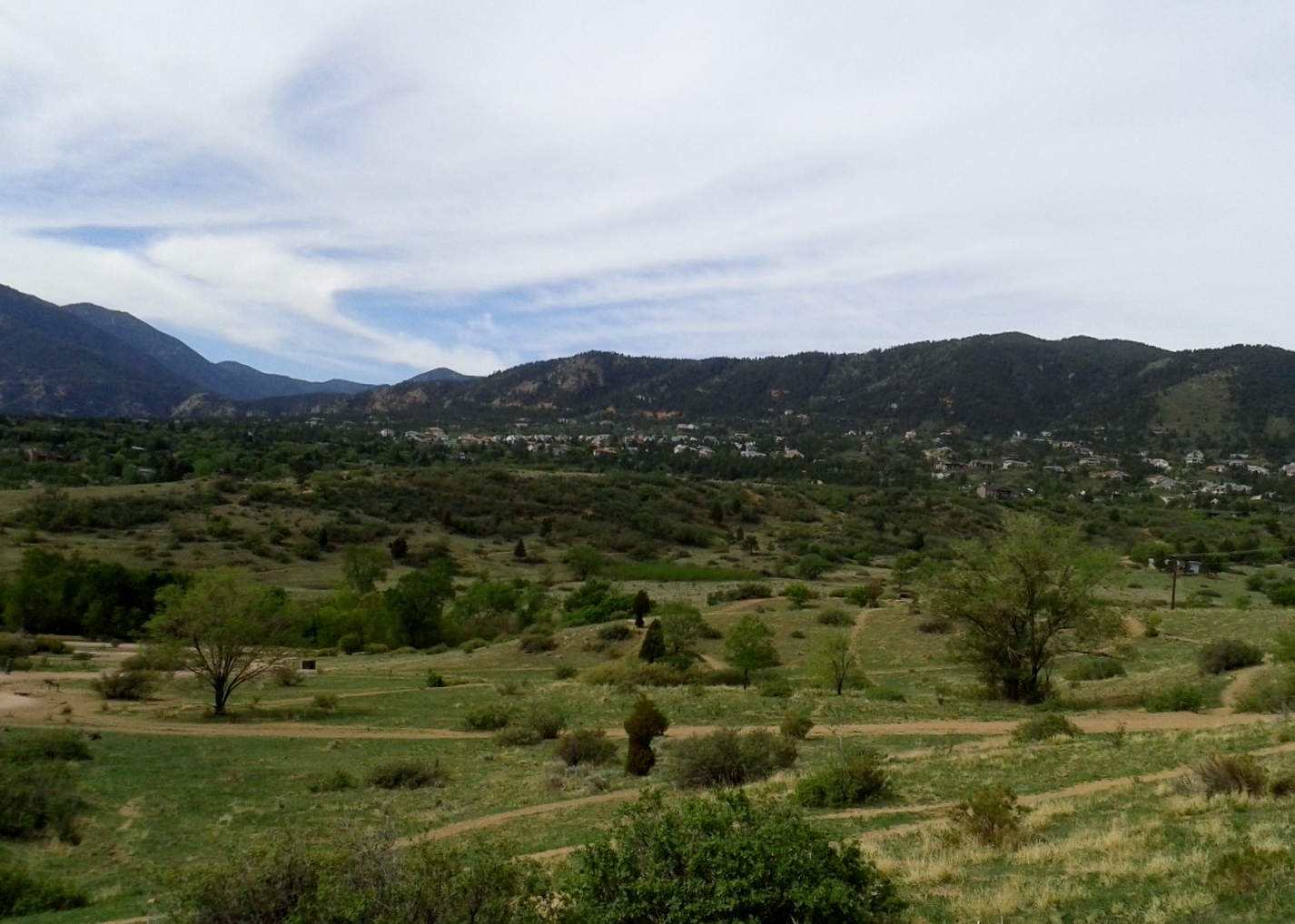
Bear Creek Dog Park trails

The city's dog parks includes the 25-acre (10 ha) Bear Creek Dog Park in the western part of the city, Cheyenne Meadows Dog Park in the south, Palmer Park Dog Park in the north, and Rampart Dog Park, the northernmost park.

There are dog runs on the Dog Loop Trail at Red Rock Canyon Open Space and east of Rock Ledge Ranch Historic Site at Garden of the Gods. There is also a dog run at Yucca Flats in Palmer Park. Colorado Springs was voted number 1 "Best Cities for Dogs" by Men's Health and the number 1 "America's Most Pet-Friendly City" by Forbes magazine.

== List ==
Park	Address	Zipcode	Type	Comments
Bear Creek Regional Park and Nature Center	Varies by park section, see comments	80906	County (Note: Other El Paso County parks, identified as Colorado Springs, but are in Black Forest, Widefield or Security, include: Widefield Community Park, Black Forest Regional Park, Fox Run Regional Park, Ceresa Park, and Crews Gulch Trail.)	Nature Center (245 Bear Creek Road), Bear Creek Dog Park (21st and West Rio Grande), Bear Creek East (21st and West Rio Grande), and Bear Creek Terrace (21st and Argus Road)
America the Beautiful Park	126 Cimino Drive	80903	Community	Formerly Confluence Park. Redeveloped and re-dedicated in 2005.
Stratmoor Hills Park	413 Sinton Avenue	80906	County	The 1.5-acre (0.61 ha) park includes play areas, a playground, basketball court, open grass area, picnic areas and a picnic pavilion.
Bear Creek Cañon Park	501 Bear Creek Road	80906	Regional	Mountain biking, picnic tables, and trails.
Garden of the Gods	3130 North 30th Street	80904	Regional	Handicapped and ADA access, mountain biking, picnic tables, rock climbing wall, and trails. Parking and restroom facilities.
Jimmy Camp Creek Park (Jimmy's Camp)	Highway 24 East	80915	Regional	Undeveloped.
North Cheyenne Cañon Park	2110 N Cheyenne Canyon Road	80906	Regional	Handicapped and ADA access, mountain biking, picnic tables, reservation shelter, rock climbing wall, and trails. Parking and restroom facilities.
North Slope Recreation Area	Pikes Peak Highway		Regional	Exercise course, mountain biking, reservation shelter, and tennis courts. Parking lot.
Palmer Park	3650 Maizeland Road	80909	Regional	Baseball and softball fields, mountain biking, picnic tables, reservation shelter, soccer field, trails and volleyball court. Parking and restroom facilities.
Ute Valley	1705 Vindicator Drive	80919	Regional	Fishing, mountain biking, and trails. Parking lot.
Norman "Bulldog" Coleman Park	4385 Tutt Boulevard	80922	Community	Soccer field. Parking lot.
Cottonwood Creek Community Park	7040 Rangewood Drive	80918	Community	Basketball court, handicapped and ADA access, in-line hockey court, picnic tables, playground, soccer field, swimming pool, tennis courts, trails and recreation center. Parking and restroom facilities.
Northeast Recreation Center	3920 Dublin Boulevard	80918	Community	Basketball court, handicapped and ADA access, in-line hockey court, picnic tables, playground, soccer field, swimming pool, tennis courts, trails and recreation center. Parking and restroom facilities.
Memorial Community Park	1605 E Pikes Peak Avenue	80910	Community	Baseball and softball fields, basketball court, boating, exercise course, fishing, football field, handicapped and ADA access, horseshoe pits, in-line hockey court, mountain biking, picnic tables, picnic shelter, playground, reservations shelter, soccer field, swimming pool, tennis courts, trails, volleyball court, and recreation center. Parking and restroom facilities.
Monument Valley Park	170 W Cache La Poudre Street	80903	Community	Basketball court, exercise course, handicapped and ADA access, picnic tables, picnic shelter, playground, reservations shelter, soccer field, swimming pool, tennis courts, trails, and volleyball court. Parking and restroom facilities.
Tutt Community Park	3125 Tutt Boulevard	80922	Community	Undeveloped
John Venezia Community Park	9330 N Union Boulevard	80920	Community	Opened July 2017. Turf athletic fields, spray ground, playground, tennis courts, pickleball courts, basketball courts,picnic tables
Wilson Ranch Community Park	2335 Allegheny Drive	80919	Community	Baseball and softball fields, basketball court, handicapped and ADA access, in-line hockey court, picnic tables, picnic shelter, playground, swimming pool, tennis courts, trails and recreation center. Parking and restroom facilities.
Ute Valley	1705 Vindicator Drive	80919	Community	Fishing, mountain biking, trails. Parking lot.
Austin Bluffs Open Space	1910 Rimwood Drive	80918	Open Space	Austin Bluffs, Pulpit Rock, and University Park open space areas make up the 585.5-acre (236.9 ha) Austin Bluffs Open Space area. There are trails throughout the area, but the most developed trails are near Pulpit Rock. Trailheads are located off Rockhurst Boulevard and N. Nevada Avenue. It is considered "unique" by the United States Forest Service for its unusual sandstone rock formations.
Blair Bridge Open Space	4001 N. 30th Street	80904	Open Space	The 37.4-acre (15.1 ha) area provides access to Foothills Trail and has a historic stone bridge.
Blodgett Peak Open Space	3898 W. Woodmen Road	80919	Open Space	As of June 2013, the area is closed due to damage from the Waldo Canyon fire. The Waldo Canyon Fire Restoration project is managed by the Open Space Volunteers group. One of the projects for this open space is to minimize erosion by installing log erosion barriers on June 9. 2013. When the area reopens: Walking trails traverse the 167.2-acre (67.7 ha) property. Parking is available at the trailhead.
Bluestem Prairie Open Space	S. Powers Boulevard and Bradley Road	80911	Open Space	Walking trails along the 646.9-acre (261.8 ha) open space provide views of the Front Range and the Big Johnson Reservoir.
Broadview Open Space	South of Fillmore, East of Mesa Road	80919	Open Space	The Mesa Valley Trail may be accessed from the 11-acre (4.5 ha) open space.
Cheyenne Mountain Open Space	South of Bayfield Drive	80906	Open Space	Walking trails cross the 22.3-acre (9.0 ha) property.
Cheyenne Mountain State Park backdrop	West of Cheyenne Mountain State Park	80926	Open Space	The property is 832.5 acres (336.9 ha).
Corral Bluffs Open Space	Corral Valley Road off Highway 94	80831	Open Space	The open space, with important paleontological and archaeological resources, is not yet open to the public. Guided tours are available at the park. The Corral Bluffs Alliance (CoBA; corralbluffs.org) works to preserve the park and its resources and guides tours.
Douglas Creek Open Space	1319 Holland Park Boulevard	80907	Open Space	The area is 22.4 acres (9.1 ha) and provides access to the Sinton Trail.
High Chaparral Open Space	5002 N. Powers Boulevard	80920	Open Space	The 56.4-acre (22.8 ha) open space has parking near the trailhead on south side of Stetson Hills Boulevard. The terrain is mixed grass prairie and has scrub oak. The highest point in Colorado Springs is the crest of the ridge in this open space.
Manitou Section 16 Open Space	Lower Gold Camp Road	80906	Open Space	Gravel trails, beginning at the trailhead on Lower Gold Camp Road and across 634.5 acres (256.8 ha), link to Red Rock Canyon Open Space.
Mesa Valley Open Space	South of Fillmore Street, East of Mesa Road	80904	Open Space	The open space covers 41.8 acres (16.9 ha). Trails provide access to the Mesa Valley trailhead.
North Gate Open Space	North Gate development area	80920/80921	Open Space	There is a total of 172.7 acres (69.9 ha) with open space tracts in the North Gate development area.
Pikeview Reservoir #1	South of Garden of the Gods Road and N. Nevada Avenue	80907	Open Space	People may fish in the reservoir, which sits within 14.2 acres. There is access to the Pikes Peak Greenway trail. A parking lot is just off Mark Dabling Boulevard.
Pulpit Rock Open Space	See Austin Bluffs Open Space	80918	Open Space	
Red Rock Canyon Open Space	3615 W. High Street, off of Highway 24	80904	Open Space	13.8 miles (22.2 km) of developed trails for hiking and horse-back riding are found in the 784.9 acres (317.6 ha) open space. There is also a dog off-leash trail and picnic area. Parking is off of Ore Mill Road and 31st Street, including a horse trailer area, and the main parking area is off of Ridge Road and Highway 24.
Rockrimmon Open Space	Tammarron Drive and Saddle Mountain Road	80919	Open Space	The open space is 77.9 acres (31.5 ha).
Sinton Pond Open Space	Sinton Road between Fillmore Street and Garden of the Gods Road	80907	Open Space	A wetlands area is located within the 13.1-acre (5.3 ha) open space.
Sondermann Park	740 W. Caramillo Street	80907	Open Space	The 99.5-acre (40.3 ha) open space amenities include trails which connect to the Mesa Valley Trail, Catamount Institute at the Beidleman Environmental Center, Mesa Creek, and picnic area. Some of the areas are wheelchair accessible. Catamount Institute hosts school programs and outdoor environmental education in Sondermann Park. All of the trails are hiking only with exception of the Mesa Valley Trail being the only mixed-use trail in the open space.
South Face Open Space	Vindicator Drive	80919	Open Space	There are 17.2 acres (7.0 ha) in this open space.
Stratton Open Space	Alongside North Cheyenne Canon Park	80906	Open Space	There are "hiking only" and multi-use trails, which allow for horse-back riding, hiking and biking. There are two trailheads, Le Veta Way trailhead west of Cresta Road (21st Street) and Ridgeway Avenue, north of W. Cheyenne Boulevard. A restroom is located at the La Veta trailhead and there is parking at both trailheads. There are 318.3 acres (128.8 ha) in this open space.
Sunset Mesa Open Space	5685 Flintridge Drive	80918	Open Space	The 78-acre (32 ha) property has a gravel path.
Union Meadows Open Space	N. Union Boulevard, between Austin Bluffs Parkway and N. Academy Boulevard	80918	Open Space	There are 31.9 acres (12.9 ha).
Woodmen Valley Open Space	2526 W. Woodmen Road	80919	Open Space	There are 29.6 acres (12.0 ha).
Acacia	115 E Platte Avenue	80903	Neighborhood	Acacia Park, the city's first park, is located at Bijou and Tejon Streets, adjacent to the Palmer High School. The park is enjoyed by high school students at lunchtime and in the summer children enjoy the Uncle Wilber Fountain. Visitors also include people who work downtown, shoppers and other visitors. The park has a band shell.
Adams	851 Boggs Place	80910	Neighborhood	There are 2 baseball and soccer fields on the 6.4-acre (2.6 ha) park.
Alamo Square	215 S Tejon Street	80903	Neighborhood	The square is the home of the historic 1903-1973 El Paso County Courthouse that is now the site of the Colorado Springs Pioneers Museum, which has fine art and historical exhibits and a museum store. A fountain, sculptures and gazebo are located in the park. Formerly known as South Park.
Antlers	31 W Pikes Peak Avenue	80903	Neighborhood	Antlers Park, situated on 3.4 acres (1.4 ha), includes a sidewalk path, picnic area, and reservation picnic shelter amenities. The park is handicapped accessible. It has a historic locomotive exhibit.(For citations, see Adams Park, a neighborhood park.)
Audubon	2460 N Circe Drive	80909	Neighborhood	The 3-acre (1.2 ha) park has a soccer field, sidewalk path, and picnic area.(For citations, see Adams Park, a neighborhood park.)
Bancroft	2408 W Colorado Avenue	80904	Neighborhood	A picnic area and shelter, band shell and sidewalk path are located in the 1.2-acre (0.49 ha) path. The park is handicapped accessible and has restroom facilities.(For citations, see Adams Park, a neighborhood park.)
Roy Benavidez	3395 Afternoon Circle	80910	Neighborhood	Within the 7.1-acre (2.9 ha) park is a playground, picnic shelter and sand volleyball court.(For citations, see Adams Park, a neighborhood park.)
Blunt	2329 W Vermijo Avenue	80904	Neighborhood	Sports facilities are available in the 3.3-acre (1.3 ha) park for baseball, softball, basketball, soccer, football and a multi-play half-court. There are also playground and picnic areas and a sidewalk path.(For citations, see Adams Park, a neighborhood park.)
Bonforte	2323 N Wahsatch Avenue	80907	Neighborhood	There are 2 fields for baseball or softball, 2 fields for soccer or football and 2 tennis courts in the park. There is also a picnic shelter, playground, sidewalk path and restrooms. The park is handicap accessible. It is 8 acres (3.2 ha) in size.(For citations, see Adams Park, a neighborhood park.)
Bott	815 S 26th Street	80904	Neighborhood	The 3.9-acre (1.6 ha) park includes a multi-play court, 2 tennis courts and a basketball court. There is also a picnic shelter and playground.(For citations, see Adams Park, a neighborhood park.)
Boulder	1210 E Boulder Street	80909	Neighborhood	There are fields for softball or baseball and football or soccer, a multi-play court and 2 tennis courts, with practice boards. Within the 7.2-acre (2.9 ha) park are also a picnic area, playground, sidewalk path and restrooms.(For citations, see Adams Park, a neighborhood park.)
Boulder Crescent	290 N Cascade Avenue	80903	Neighborhood	There is a picnic table and historic plaque in the small park.(For citations, see Adams Park, a neighborhood park.)
Bricker	4860 Dover Drive	80916	Neighborhood	The park has a playground and soccer field. It is located on 4 acres (1.6 ha).(For citations, see Adams Park, a neighborhood park.)
Bristol	910 N Walnut Street	80905	Neighborhood	There is a picnic table in the 3.2-acre (1.3 ha) park.(For citations, see Adams Park, a neighborhood park.)
Broadmoor Bluffs	5315 Farthing Drive	80906	Neighborhood	A picnic area and playground are located in the 4.4-acre (1.8 ha) park. There is also an area for sledding.(For citations, see Adams Park, a neighborhood park.)
Broadmoor Glen	4035 Danceglen Drive	80906	Neighborhood	Tennis court, softball or baseball field and shuffleboard court are located in the 4.3-acre (1.7 ha)re park. It is handicapped accessible and also includes a picnic area and playground.(For citations, see Adams Park, a neighborhood park.)
Broadmoor Valley	3750 Broadmoor Valley Drive	80906	Neighborhood	On 11.6 acres (4.7 ha) are a field for soccer or football, a field for baseball or softball, and basketball courts. There is also a picnic area and playground. The park is handicapped accessible and there are rest rooms.(For citations, see Adams Park, a neighborhood park.)
Buckskin Charlie	7665 Scarborough	80920	Neighborhood	Sports facilities include an in-line hockey area, basketball court, tee ball field and multi-use play fields. There is a picnic area and playground. The 4.3-acre (1.7 ha) park also has a memorial to Buckskin Charlie Memorial.(For citations, see Adams Park, a neighborhood park.)
Candleflower	7690 Contrails Drive	80920	Neighborhood	The 5-acre (2.0 ha) park has a playground, open play area, walkways, and picnic sites. It is handicapped accessible.(For citations, see Adams Park, a neighborhood park.)
Carver	4242 Carefree Circle N	80907	Neighborhood	There are 2 fields for football or soccer, and a basketball court.(For citations, see Adams Park, a neighborhood park.)
Frank Castello	7640 Potomac Drive	80920	Neighborhood	There are fields for softball or baseball and also for football or soccer. The 6.6-acre (2.7 ha) park also has a picnic area, playground and multi-use court.(For citations, see Adams Park, a neighborhood park.)
Centennial	3480 El Morro Road	80910	Neighborhood	It is a 3.7-acre (1.5 ha) park.(For citations, see Adams Park, a neighborhood park.)
Cheyenne Meadows	3868 Glenmeadow Drive	80906	Neighborhood	The 20.5-acre (8.3 ha) park has fields for baseball or softball, a soccer field, basketball call, multi-use court, and horseshoe pit. There are also sidewalk paths, a picnic shelter, and playground. At Charmwood Road and Canoe Creek Drive is a fenced dog park.(For citations, see Adams Park, a neighborhood park.)
Cucharras	1121 W Cucharras Street	80904	Neighborhood	The small park has a multi-play court, basketball court, playground and picnic area.(For citations, see Adams Park, a neighborhood park.)
Danville	1147 Mountview Lane	80907	Neighborhood	Basketball, multi-play court, baseball and softball field, and football and soccer field. There is also a picnic area, large group picnic area, and a playground on the 5.3 acre park.(For citations, see Adams Park, a neighborhood park.)
Deerfield	4290 Deerfield Hills Road	80916	Neighborhood	The 12.7-acre (5.1 ha) park has a multi-play court and playground. There is also the Deerfield Community Center, greenhouse and community garden. The park is handicapped accessible and had a sidewalk path. There is an outdoor Spray Ground [a place where children can play in a spray of water], concession and vending machines, and rest rooms.(For citations, see Adams Park, a neighborhood park.)
Discovery	155 Buckeye Drive	80919	Neighborhood	There are combined baseball and softball—and soccer and football fields, 2 playgrounds and picnic tables are in the 11.7-acre (4.7 ha) park.(For citations, see Adams Park, a neighborhood park.)
Dorchester	1130 S Nevada Avenue	80903	Neighborhood	The 7.4-acre (3.0 ha) park has picnic and large group picnic shelters, a playground and restrooms.(For citations, see Adams Park, a neighborhood park.)
Dublin	2450 Roundtop Drive	80918	Neighborhood	Sports facilities in the 15.1-acre (6.1 ha) park include a volleyball court, basketball court and fields for baseball and softball, as well as soccer and football. The park is handicapped accessible with a playground, picnic area, and sidewalk path.(For citations, see Adams Park, a neighborhood park.)
Erindale	1705 Twin Daks Drive, east of Lemonwood Drive	80918	Neighborhood	There is a playground, multi-play court, picnic area and sidewalk path. The park is 6.6-acre (2.7 ha). (For citations, see Adams Park, a neighborhood park.)
Explorer	4260 Bardot Drive, east of Explorer Elementary School	80920	Neighborhood	There is a playground, in-line hockey court, and walking path in the 7.3-acre (3.0 ha) park.(For citations, see Adams Park, a neighborhood park.)
Fairfax	8175 Chancellor Drive	80920	Neighborhood	There is a soccer field and basketball court at the 5.1-acre (2.1 ha) park. It is handicapped accessible with a playground and picnic shelter.(For citations, see Adams Park, a neighborhood park.)
George Fellows	5711 Tuckerman Drive	80918	Neighborhood	The 10.3 neighborhood park has a playground, children's garden, and picnic shelter. It is handicapped accessible.(For citations, see Adams Park, a neighborhood park.)
Flanagan	3132 N Prospect Street	80907	Neighborhood	The park has a multi-play court, basketball, baseball and softball field, and a football and soccer field. There is a playground, picnic area, large group picnic shelter and sidewalk path in the 4.7-acre (1.9 ha) park.(For citations, see Adams Park, a neighborhood park.)
Foothills	853 Allegheny Drive	80919	Neighborhood	The 7.7-acre (3.1 ha) park has a baseball field, basketball court, combined football and soccer field, multi-play court and volleyball court. the park is handicapped accessible with a picnic area, large group picnic shelter, playground, sidewalk path and rest rooms.(For citations, see Adams Park, a neighborhood park.)
Fountain	901 E Fountain Boulevard	80903	Neighborhood	There is a baseball and softball field, football and soccer field, multi-play court, and 2 volleyball courts. The 10.7-acre (4.3 ha) park is handicapped accessible with a shelter for picnicking, playground, and rest rooms. The park is home to the Hillside Community Center. (For citations, see Adams Park, a neighborhood park.)
Franklin	2951 E Dale Street	80909	Neighborhood	The 2.6-acre (1.1 ha) park has a baseball and softball field, as well as a football and soccer field.(For citations, see Adams Park, a neighborhood park.)
Fremont	5080 El Camino Drive	80918	Neighborhood	The 6.9-acre (2.8 ha) park has a playground, baseball and softball field, as well as 2 football and soccer fields. (For citations, see Adams Park, a neighborhood park.)
Ford Frick	8025 N Union Boulevard	80920	Neighborhood	Sports facilities include a soccer field and baseball field. The 12.5-acre (5.1 ha) park also has a playground, picnic shelter, and rest rooms. (For citations, see Adams Park, a neighborhood park.)
Frontier	3725 Meadow Ridge Drive	80920	Neighborhood	On 5.3 acres (2.1 ha), there are a baseball and softball field, basketball court, and a football and soccer field. There is also a picnic shelter, playground, and sidewalk path. (For citations, see Adams Park, a neighborhood park.)
Garden Ranch	2220 Montebello Drive W	80918	Neighborhood	The park has a basketball court, baseball and softball field, fitness trail, football and soccer field, and a volleyball court. The park is handicapped accessible with a playground, picnic area, large group picnic shelter, and rest rooms. (For citations, see Adams Park, a neighborhood park.)
Giberson	2890 Ferber Drive	80916	Neighborhood	The park has a baseball and softball field, football and soccer field, playground and large group picnic shelter. (For citations, see Adams Park, a neighborhood park.)
Laura Gilpin	7415 Kettle Drum Street	80922	Neighborhood	The 23.1-acre (9.3 ha) park has an inline skate court, soccer field, basketball court, playground, picnic pavilion, and walking paths. (For citations, see Adams Park, a neighborhood park.)
Glen Oaks	5445 Broadmoor Bluffs Drive	80906	Neighborhood	The 4.8-acre (1.9 ha) park has a playground. (For citations, see Adams Park, a neighborhood park.)
Gold Camp	1536 Gold Spike Terr	80905	Neighborhood	There is a baseball field, skateboard area, basketball court, playground, picnic area, and a 0.25-mile (0.40 km) sidewalk loop in the park. (For citations, see Adams Park, a neighborhood park.)
Golden Hills	6155 Delmonico Drive	80919	Neighborhood	There is a baseball field and basketball court in the 5-acre (2.0 ha) park. It is handicapped accessible with a playground, picnic area, large group picnic shelter, rest rooms, and a sidewalk path. (For citations, see Adams Park, a neighborhood park.)
Grant	2821 Shadowglen Drive	80918	Neighborhood	There is a basketball court, baseball and softball field, multi-play court, and 2 football/soccer fields. A picnic area and playground are also part of the 12.1-acre (4.9 ha) park amenities. (For citations, see Adams Park, a neighborhood park.)
Happy Hollow Playground	218 Milton Drive	80910	Neighborhood	The small park has a picnic area and playground. (For citations, see Adams Park, a neighborhood park.)
Heathercrest	1975 Heathercrest Drive	80915	Neighborhood	The park has a baseball and softball field, sand volleyball court, and basketball court. The handicap accessible park has a picnic area, large group shelter, and trails and a sidewalk path. (For citations, see Adams Park, a neighborhood park.)
Patrick Henry	1404 Lehmberg Blvd	80915	Neighborhood	The park has a soccer field, multi-purpose field and basketball court. The 7.9-acre (3.2 ha) park has a playground and picnic area. (For citations, see Adams Park, a neighborhood park.)
High Meadows	4216 Ashby Field Dr	80922	Neighborhood	The park has a basketball court, inline skate court, playground and picnic area. (For citations, see Adams Park, a neighborhood park.)
Homestead	5300 Carefree Cir S	80917	Neighborhood	Amenities at the 5.2-acre (2.1 ha) park includes a basketball court, playground and trails and sidewalks for mountain biking and hiking. (For citations, see Adams Park, a neighborhood park.)
Honeybear Playground	226 Longfellow Dr	80910	Neighborhood	The small park has a volleyball court, playground and picnic area. (For citations, see Adams Park, a neighborhood park.)
Ivywild	1645 Dorchester Street	80906	Neighborhood	A climbing rock, playground, picnic area, and 0.2-mile (0.32 km) sidewalk loop are found at the 7.6-acre (3.1 ha) park. (For citations, see Adams Park, a neighborhood park.)
Jackson	1111 Holland Park Blvd	80907	Neighborhood	The nearly 10-acre (4.0 ha) park has a baseball and softball field, 4 tennis courts, and a football field. It also has a playground and picnic area. (For citations, see Adams Park, a neighborhood park.)
Jefferson	2580 Lelaray Drive	80909	Neighborhood	There is a soccer and football field, playground and picnic area. (For citations, see Adams Park, a neighborhood park.)
Jenkins	1019 Skyway Boulevard S	80906	Neighborhood	The park has a playground and picnic area. (For citations, see Adams Park, a neighborhood park.)
Jared Jensen	6724 Windom Peak Boulevard	80922	Neighborhood	The 3.5-acre (1.4 ha) park has an inline skate court, skateboard area, basketball court, playground, picnic pavilion, and a .3 mi sidewalk loop. (For citations, see Adams Park, a neighborhood park.)
Ken Jordan	5914 High Noon Drive	80922	Neighborhood	Sports facilities include a basketball court, T-Ball and baseball field, horseshoe pits, and a climbing structure. There's also a picnic pavilion, playground, and a .25 mi sidewalk loop. (For citations, see Adams Park, a neighborhood park.)
Keller	4950 Meadowland Boulevard	80918	Neighborhood	The 17.6-acre (7.1 ha) park includes a playground and fields for baseball, softball, football and soccer. (For citations, see Adams Park, a neighborhood park.)
Keystone	6050 Sapporo Drive	80918	Neighborhood	Facilities at the park include a volleyball court, baseball and softball field, playground, and soccer and football field. (For citations, see Adams Park, a neighborhood park.)
Betty Krouse	2415 E Cache La Poudre Street	80909	Neighborhood	The 2.4-acre (0.97 ha) park includes fields for baseball and soccer and a basketball court. It has a picnic shelter, playground and trails/sidewalk path for hiking and mountain biking. (For citations, see Adams Park, a neighborhood park.)
Mary Kyer	1101 Middle Creek Parkway	80921	Neighborhood	Sports facilities include a basketball and inline hockey court, multi-use play fields, a tennis court, and multi-purpose field for baseball and soccer. it also includes a playground, picnic area and shelter, portable toilet, and parking. A pond with recycling stream, island with gazebo on the 11-acre (4.5 ha) park, trailhead and a 0.6-mile (0.97 km) loop for walking and jogging.
Nancy Lewis	2615 Logan Avenue	80907	Neighborhood	The nearly 9-acre (3.6 ha) park includes a field for soccer and t-ball, sand volleyball court, and croquet and putting green area. There is a pond/waterfall/fountain, playground, picnic area and shelter, and a restroom. The handicapped accessible park has sidewalk paths and a hospice tree dedication legacy wall.
Little Britches Playground	4105 Channing Place	80910	Neighborhood	There is a playground and multi-play court.
Lunar	2112 E Uintah Street	80909	Neighborhood	There is a playground, picnic area, and multi-play court.
Judge Lunt	4870 Seton PI	80918	Neighborhood	Sports facilities include a baseball field, soccer field, basketball court, and in-line hockey court. The park is handicapped accessible and has a playground, picnic tables, trails and a sidewalk path for hiking and mountain biking.
Madison	2122 N Murray Boulevard	80909	Neighborhood	The 4-acre (1.6 ha) park includes a field for soccer and football and space for sledding and mountain biking.
Kathleen Marriage	2320 Amberwood Lane	80920	Neighborhood	The park has a in-line hockey court, basketball court, area for sledding, and a playfield. The park is wheelchair accessible and includes picnic tables and a playground.
Eugene McCleary	5214 Pioneer Mesa Drive	80918	Neighborhood	There is a basketball/in-line hockey court, multi-purpose field for baseball and soccer, and backstop. There is a picnic area with grills and playground in the 5.1-acre (2.1 ha) park.
Fred McKown	5155 Balsam Street	80918	Neighborhood	Nearly 10 acres (4.0 ha), the park includes a backstop, multi-purpose field for baseball and soccer, and basketball court. The picnic area has grills and there is a playground.
Meadowlark	2709 Dickens Drive	80916	Neighborhood	The park has a soccer field, multi-use court, and a volleyball court. The 6.7-acre (2.7 ha) park is handicapped accessible and has a playground and trails/sidewalk paths.
Meadowridge	8320 Boxelder Drive	80920	Neighborhood	The 7-acre (2.8 ha) park is handicapped accessible and has a playground and trails/sidewalk paths.
Meadows	1990 S El Paso Avenue	80906	Neighborhood	The 6.1-acre (2.5 ha) park has a field for baseball and softball, multi-play court, a basketball court, and football and soccer field. There is a community center with a gym, auditorium with a stage, picnic area, and playground. The park, also called Mid Shooks Run Park, is 6.1 acres (2.5 ha).
Monterey	2225 Monterey Road	80910	Neighborhood	The park has fields for baseball, softball, soccer, and football. The 4.5-acre (1.8 ha) park is handicapped accessible and has a playground.
Mountain Shadows	5151 Flying W Ranch Road	80919	Neighborhood	Fields for softball and soccer, volleyball court, sledding area and horseshoe pits are at the 6.5-acre (2.6 ha) park. It is handicapped accessible with a playground, picnic pavilion, and a multi-use trail.
Mountain View Playground	206 Longfellow Drive	80910	Neighborhood	There is a playground and picnic area in the small 0.5-acre (2,000 m^{2}) park.
Munchkin Playground	4319 Vehr Drive	80916	Neighborhood	There is a playground and picnic area in the small 0.6-acre (2,400 m^{2}) park.
John 'Prairie Dog' O'Byrne	505 E Bijou Street	80903	Neighborhood	Formerly called High Street Park, the 1.7-acre (6,900 m^{2}) park has a climbing structure and picnic area. (For citations, see Adams Park, a neighborhood park.)
Oak Meadows	4960 Farthing Drive	80906	Neighborhood	The park has an open play field and a basketball court. The park is handicapped accessible with a playground, picnic shelter, trails and sidewalk paths, and restrooms in the 3.7-acre (1.5 ha) park.
Oak Valley Ranch	2325 Silent Rain Drive	80919	Neighborhood	There is a field for soccer and t-ball and a basketball court. The 4.7-acre (1.9 ha) park is handicapped accessible with a picnic area and shelter, playground, picnicking, shelter, and trails and walkways.
Old Farm	5260 Old Farm Circle W and 4585 Old Farm Circle W	80917	Neighborhood	The 27.5-acre (11.1 ha) park has a basketball court, volleyball court and playground.
Otero	4630 lron Horse Trail	80917	Neighborhood	The park has a scenic overlook, playground, picnic area, and trails/sidewalk paths. It is 6.1 acres (2.5 ha).
Otis	731 N Iowa Avenue	80909	Neighborhood	All facilities are built to be inclusive of people in wheelchairs. The facilities include an Otis Park Community Center, field for softball and baseball, playground, multi-play court, volleyball court, running track, tetherball poles, 2 shuffleboard courts, a picnic shelter, and restrooms.
Panorama	4540 Fenton Road	80916	Neighborhood	The 12.8-acre (5.2 ha) park includes fields for baseball, softball, soccer and football. There is a picnic area and group picnic shelter. At 2145 S. Chelton Road is the Panorama Recreation Center, which has 2 volleyball courts, a basketball court, gymnasium, and restrooms.
Penrose	4295 Nonchalant Circle S	80917	Neighborhood	The 16.2-acre (6.6 ha) park includes fields for soccer, football, baseball and softball. There's a basketball court and picnic area.
Penstemon	1375 Jetwing Circle	80916	Neighborhood	A basketball court, play field, playground and picnic area are in the park.
Pike	2610 N Chestnut Street	80907	Neighborhood	There is a field for baseball and softball at the park, but their conditions are rapidly deteriorating. Had playground equipment until 2012.
Pinecliff	855 Popes Valley Drive	80919	Neighborhood	The 2.7-acre (1.1 ha) park has fields for soccer and baseball. Also at the park are a basketball court, playground, picnic area, and trails and sidewalk paths.
Pinon Valley	5585 Mule Deer Drive	80919	Neighborhood	The park has a basketball court, volleyball court and a field for softball and soccer. There is a picnic area and shelter, playground, and restroom.
Pioneer	1101 Cenotaph Circle	80904	Neighborhood	Fields for softball, baseball, soccer and football are located at the 8.9-acre (3.6 ha) park, as well as a Pioneers Memorial, picnic area and playground.
Lulu Pollard	2550 Dynamic Drive	80920	Neighborhood	The park has a soccer field. It is handicapped accessible with a picnic area, playground, trails, and sidewalk paths.
Portal	3638 Manchester Street	80907	Neighborhood	Sports facilities include fields for soccer, football, softball and baseball. There is a multi-play court, 4 tennis courts and an outdoor swimming pool. The 10.6-acre (4.3 ha), handicapped accessible park includes a playground, picnic area, trails, sidewalk path and restrooms.
Prairie Grass	710 Chapman Drive	80916	Neighborhood	The 5-acre (2.0 ha) park includes a climbing rock, basketball court, skateboard area, playground, picnic area, portable toilet, and a .15 mi sidewalk loop.
Pring Ranch	5264 Prairie Grass Ln	80922	Neighborhood	There are multi-use play fields, tee ball field, and in-line hockey/basketball court. It also has a playground, picnic area and shelter and a neighborhood link to trail system.
Quail Lake	915 E Cheyenne Mountain Blvd	80906	Neighborhood	There is boating and fishing, softball and baseball field, picnic area, playground and trails at the park.
Rampart	8270 Lexington Drive	80920	Neighborhood	
Remington	2750 Pony Tracks Drive	80922	Neighborhood	
Roosevelt	219 Byron Drive	80909	Neighborhood	
Roswell	515 Polk Street	80907	Neighborhood	
Rudy	5360 Cracker Barrel Circle	80917	Neighborhood	
Sagebrush	651 Crestline Drive	80916	Neighborhood	
Sandstone	4650 Pring Ranch Road	80922	Neighborhood	
Horace Shelby	6442 Summit Peak Drive	80922	Neighborhood	
Mid Shooks Run	631 E Saint Vrain Street	80903	Neighborhood	See the Meadows Park.
North Shooks Run	706 N Franklin Street	80903	Neighborhood	
South Shooks Run	402 E Fountain Boulevard	80903	Neighborhood	
Sierra & SE YMCA	2150 Jet Wing Drive	80916	Neighborhood	
James H. Smith	2205 Spring Blossom Drive	80910	Neighborhood	
Snowy River	6152 Snowy River Drive	80922	Neighborhood	
Soaring Eagles	3169 Spotted Tail Drive	80916	Neighborhood	
Sondermann	740 W Caramillo Street	80904	Neighborhood	
Marshall Sprague	3492 W Woodmen Road	80919	Neighborhood	The park is named for Marshall Sprague.
Springs Ranch	2990 Pony Tracks Drive	80922	Neighborhood	
Stetson Hills	4870 Jedediah Smith Road	80922	Neighborhood	
John Stone	4017 Family Pl	80920	Neighborhood	
Jack Templeton	5347 Rose Ridge Lane	80917	Neighborhood	
Thorndale	2310 W Uintah Street	80904	Neighborhood	
Tomah	5285 Tomah Drive	80918	Neighborhood	
Trues Mill	305 Longfellow Drive	80910	Neighborhood	
Twain	3320 E San Miguel Street	80909	Neighborhood	
Dr. Frank Hough	2002 Collegiate Drive	80918	Neighborhood	
Van Diest	1520 S Chelton Road	80910	Neighborhood	
Vermijo	2610 W Vermijo Avenue	80904	Neighborhood	
Villa Loma	5055 Escapardo Way	80917	Neighborhood	
Village Green	3590 Carefree Cir N	80917	Neighborhood	
Wagner	3637 E Bijou Street	80909	Neighborhood	
Wasson	1910 N Circle Drive	80909	Neighborhood	
Waters Frank	510 E Platte Avenue	80903	Neighborhood	
Wedgewood	2830 Parliament Drive	80920	Neighborhood	
West Creek	8542 Winding Passage Drive	80924	Neighborhood	
West Junior High Back Yard	1920 W Pikes Peak Avenue	80904	Neighborhood	
Westmoor	3315 Water Street	80904	Neighborhood	
Wickes Park	Wickes Drive	80919	Neighborhood	
Wildflower	950 Nolte Drive	80916	Neighborhood	
Wilson	4501 Palmer Park Boulevard	80917	Neighborhood	
Woodland Hills	3617 Woodland Hills Drive	80918	Neighborhood	
Harlan-Wolfe	905 W Cheyenne Road	80906	Neighborhood	
Woodmen Valley	2525 W Woodmen Road	80919	Neighborhood	
Woodstone	1315 Carlson Drive	80919	Neighborhood	
