= Jimmy's Camp, Colorado =

American trading post

Coordinates: 38°51′10.17″N 104°39′55.57″W

Jimmy's Camp was a trading post established in 1833. The site is east of present-day Colorado Springs, Colorado on the southeast side of U.S. Route 24 and east of the junction with State Highway 94. Located along Trapper's Trail / Cherokee Trail, it was a rest stop for travelers and was known for its spring. Jimmy Camp was a ranch by 1870 and then a railway station on a spur of the Colorado and Southern Railway. After the ranch was owned by several individuals, it became part of the Banning Lewis Ranch. Now the land is an undeveloped park in Colorado Springs.

== Fur trading and trail station ==
=== Jimmy's Camp Trail ===
The site was located on Jimmy's Camp Trail, along old Native American trails which became the Trapper's Trail and Cherokee Trail, which ran between the North Platte, South Platte and Arkansas Rivers. The north-south route had two southern branches. One branch from Bent's Old Fort and another that began in Taos and Santa Fe. They met at the confluence of the Arkansas River and Fountain Creek near present-day Pueblo, then the route ran north along the banks of Fountain Creek to Jimmy Camp Creek at Fountain. The trail went overland through present-day Black Forest to Cherry Creek where it was followed to the South Platte River. From there, the trail forked and Trapper's Trail went to Fort Laramie and Cherokee Trail went northwest to intersect with the Oregon-California Trail. There was another trail that ran closer through present-day Colorado Springs along the foothills. It approximates the route of Interstate 25, but the trail was not as safe as this more direct route used by many Native Americans and trappers because it was safer and not frequented by hostile Native Americans. Jimmy Camp Road or Jimmy Camp Trail branch of the longer Trapper's Trail / Cherokee Trail connected Fountain and Russellville.

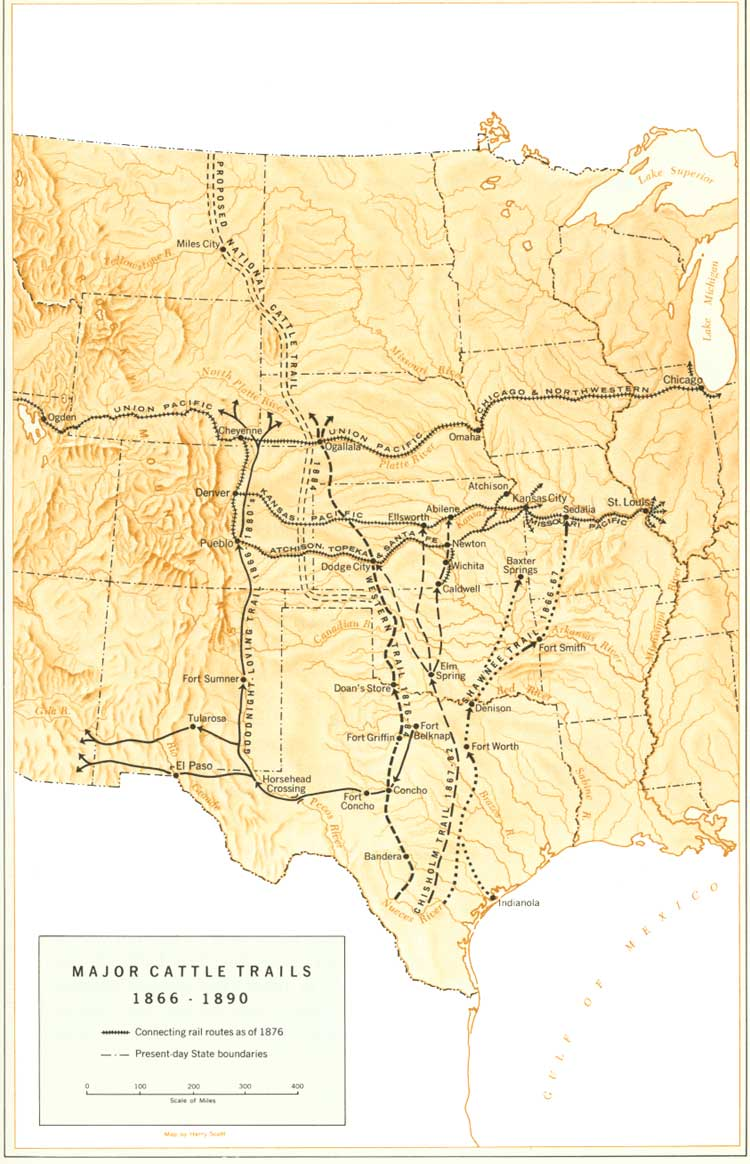
Cattle trails. The Goodnight–Loving Trail is the westernmost north-south trail to Cheyenne.

Cattle was driven north along the Goodnight–Loving Trail to Cheyenne through Jimmy's Camp.

=== Trading post, stage station and camp site ===
Jimmy built a cabin or a crude adobe hut on lowland between Jimmy Camp Creek and a spring. Trappers, Utes and other Native Americans traded furs and food (deer, buffalo, other game, and corn) for goods, guns and whiskey that Jimmy acquired from the East. Jimmy lit a signal fire to let Native Americans know when he returned with a new selection of goods. The spot was known for its spring and a place where people and their horses could rest along the trail. In addition to shade afforded by pine and cottonwood trees, there was plenty of grass for grazing around the spring.

The first recorded trapper to use the trail past Jimmy's Camp Creek was William Sublette (1829). Kit Carson came through in 1831. Individuals who camped at the site included frontiersman Jim Baker, explorer John C. Frémont, Rufus Sage (1842), Francis Parkman (1846), and the Mormons (1847). It was also visited by gold prospectors passing through the area during the Pike's Peak Gold Rush who learned about the trail from guidebooks. There was stage service from Denver to Pueblo, with Jimmy's Camp and other stops in between.

=== Namesake ===
Jimmy's Camp was often said to have been named after Jimmy Daugherty, who had been a member of Major Stephen Harriman Long's expedition. He was believed to have built a cabin in the 1820s or 1830s. Jimmy Camp Creek was first called Daugherty Creek.

Authors Alice Polk Hill and L.W. Cutler state that it was named for a small Irishman Jimmy Boyer, employed by the fur trading company, who established a trading post in 1833. Frank Hall states in the History of the State of Colorado and local resident Edgar Howbert and local historian John O'Byrne state that Jimmy Hayes or Hays established a trading post in 1833. John Steele of the Mormon Battalion of 1847 believed that Jimmy's Camp was named for Dr. Edwin James of Long's 1820 expedition.

=== Jimmy's murder and marker ===
Native Americans came to his cabin or hut one day to find that he has been robbed and murdered. They followed tracks left by men from Mexico until they found them, and hung them from trees by their toes. They returned to Jimmy's cabin, buried him, and covered his grave with a large flat stone. James Beckwourth, a scout, said that he led the Native Americans who killed the Mexicans. Rufus Sage said that Jimmy was killed by a Mexican man who traveled with him and stole some calico. This occurred prior to September 1842 when Sage camped at the site. The crude hut crumbled away after Jimmy's death.

External image
- Jimmy's Camp marker

A marker was installed by the Kinnikinnik Chapter of the Daughters of the American Revolution in 1949. It says, "This tablet is the property of the State of Colorado" / "One mile [1.6 kilometer] southeast are the spring and site of Jimmy's Camp / Named for Jimmy (last name undetermined), an early trader who was murdered there. A famous camp site on the trail connecting the Arkansas and Platte Rivers and variously known as "Trappers' Trail, " "Cherokee Trail" and "Jimmy's Camp Trail." Site visited by Rufus Sage (1842), Francis Parkman (1846), Mormons (1847), and by many gold seekers of 1858-59."

== Jimmy Camp Ranch ==
The site, called Jimmy Camp Ranch and old Jimmy Camp mine, was purchased in 1870 by early settler Matt France, who established a ranch and raised stock there. He became a mayor of the city of Colorado Springs. France and Mort Parsons built a house in 1870. In 1873, France raised a group of men from Colorado Springs to march out to Jimmy's Camp to meet with a group of 3,000 Cheyenne. They had been killing cattle on the ranch because "the white man has been killing our buffalo." The France coal mine was established by 1885 near Jimmy's Camp.

== Railway ==
The Denver and New Orleans Railroad ran alongside Jimmy Camp Creek from Denver to Jimmy's Camp and then to Fountain and Pueblo by 1880. Between 1898 and 1913, Colorado and Southern Railway operated on the rails. 0.5 miles (0.80 km) east of Jimmy Camp was a railway station called Manitou Junction for Denver and New Orleans Railroad and the Colorado and Southern Railway. From there, passengers could take a 9-mile (14 km) train road to Colorado Springs. A post office station, called Jimmy Camp, operated between 1878 and 1879.

== Banning Lewis Ranch ==
After France, there were other people who ranched on the land, which ultimately became part of the Banning Lewis Ranch. It is currently an undeveloped park in Colorado Springs.

== See also ==
- List of ghost towns in Colorado
