= Alamo Square Park, Colorado Springs =

Park

Coordinates: 38°49′49.19″N 104°49′22.14″W

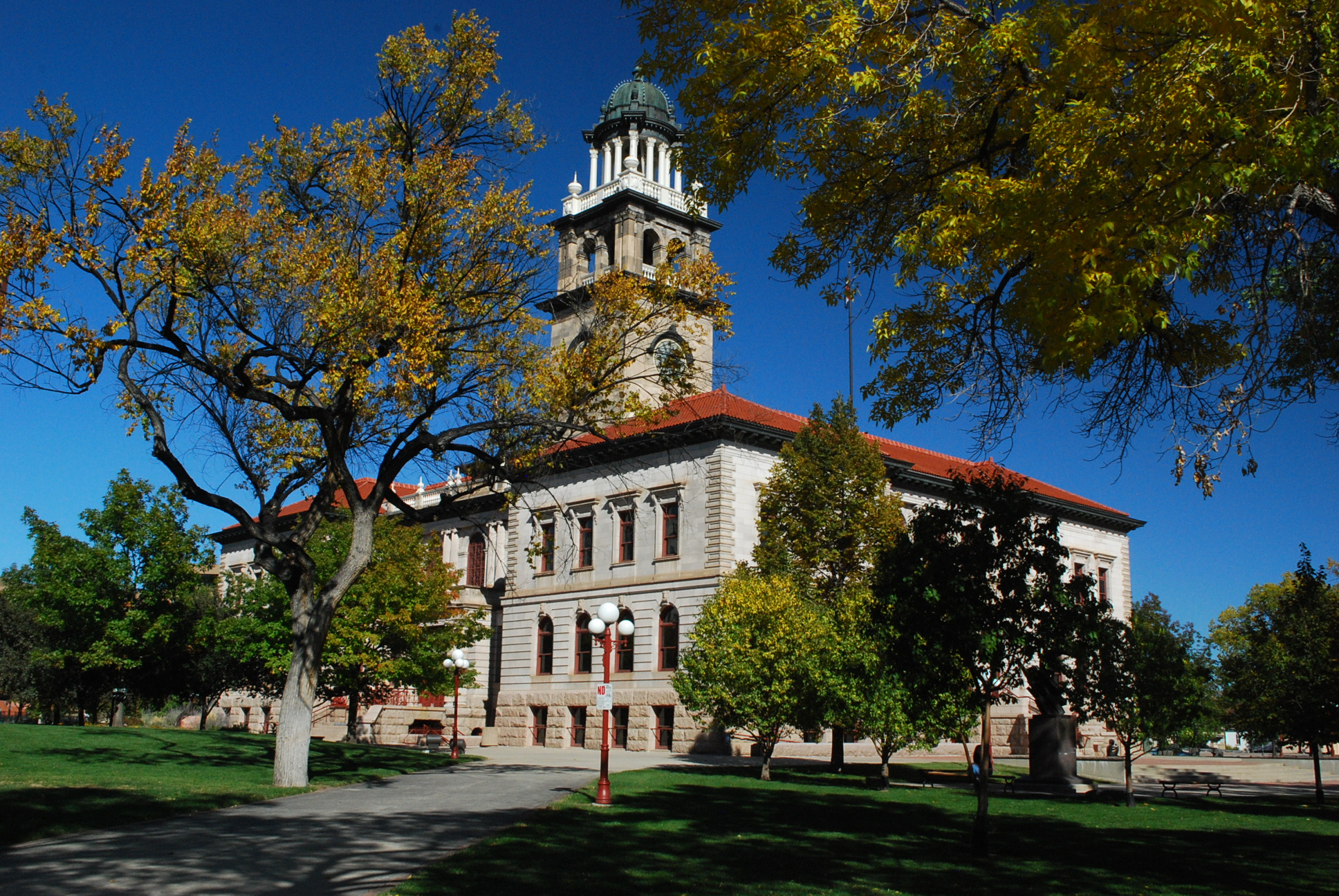
Colorado Springs Pioneer Museum

Alamo Square Park, located at 215 South Tejon Street, is the site of the Colorado Springs Pioneers Museum, which has fine art and historical exhibits and a museum store. A fountain, sculptures and gazebo are located in the park.

It was previously the El Paso County Courthouse from 1903 to 1973. The square was previously known as South Park.

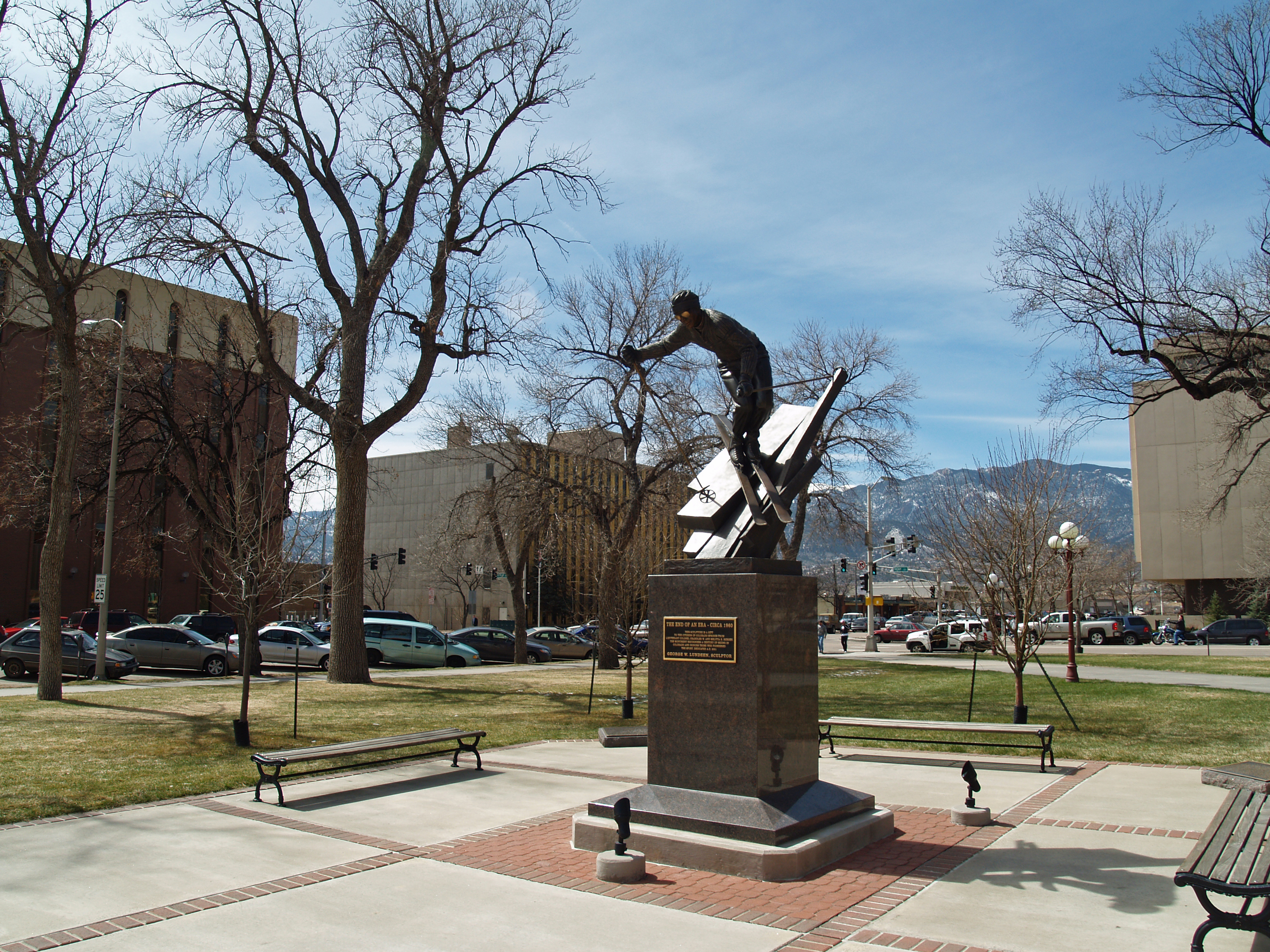
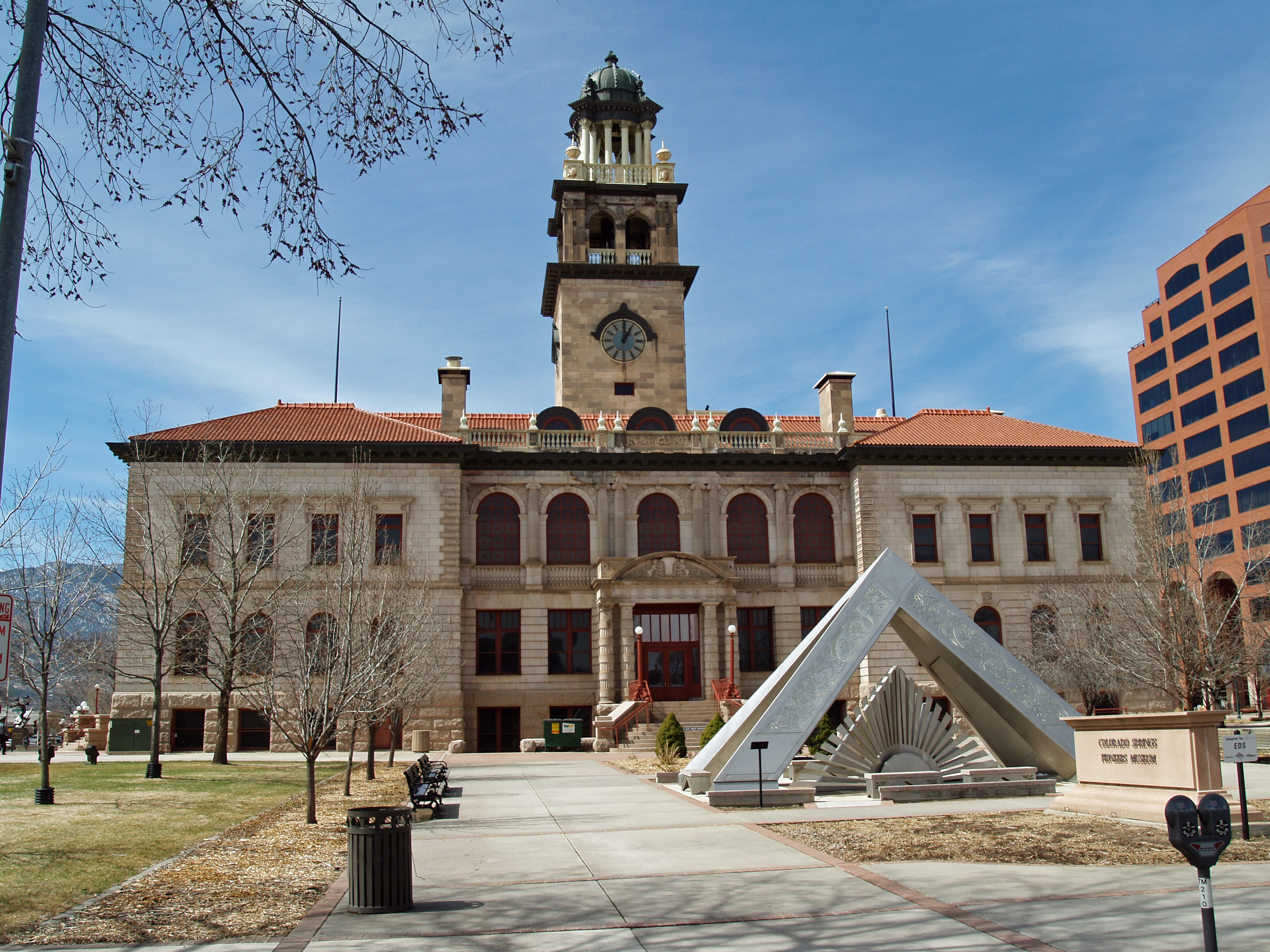

== See also ==
- List of parks in Colorado Springs, Colorado
