= Colorado Springs Pioneers Museum =

Museum in Colorado Springs, Colorado, U.S.

- Colorado Springs Pioneers Museum (El Paso County Courthouse 1903-1973)
- U.S. National Register of Historic Places
- Colorado State Register of Historic Properties No. 5EP.190
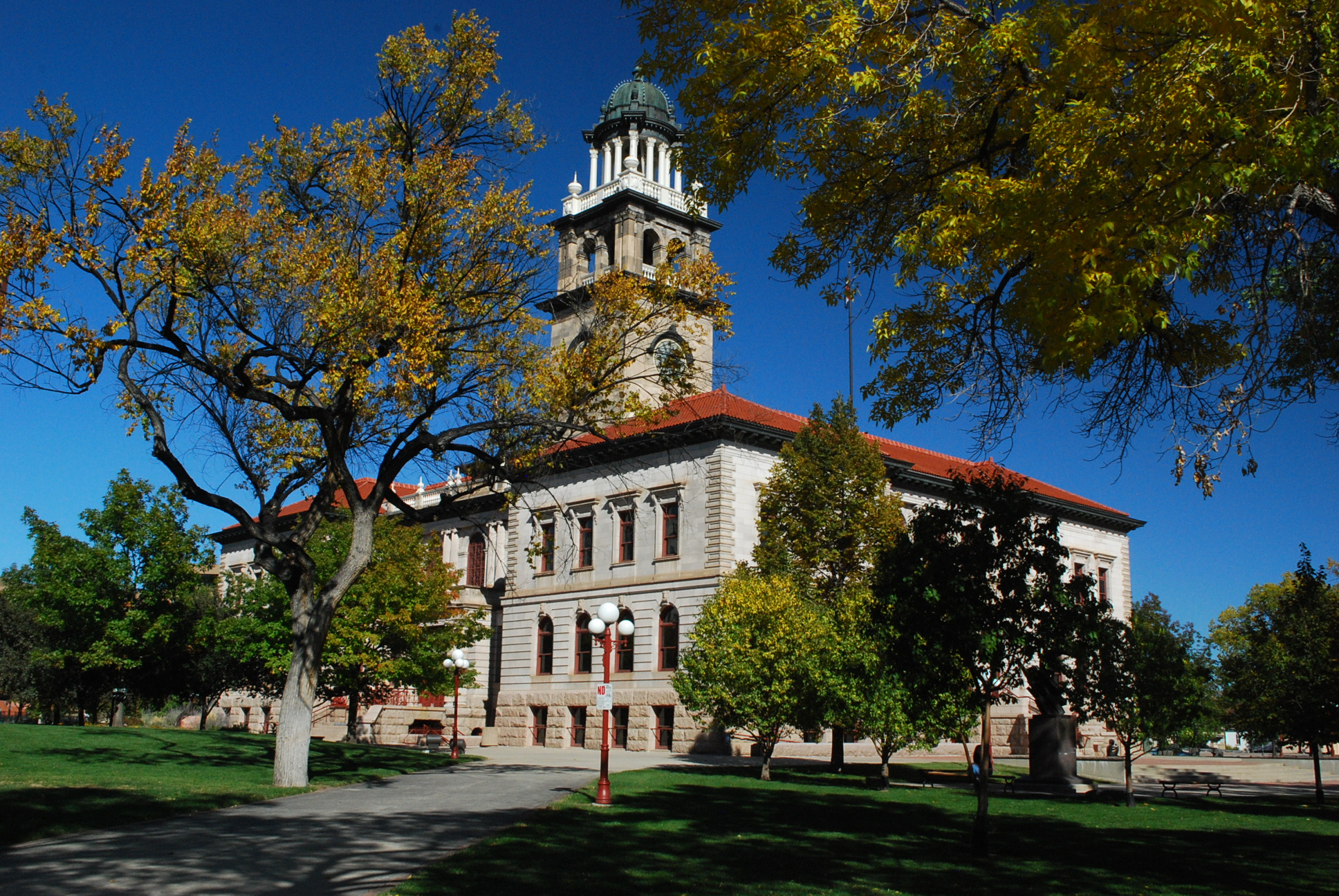

- Location within Colorado Location within the United States
- Location: 215 S. Tejon Street, Colorado Springs, Colorado, U.S.
- Coordinates: 38°49′48″N 104°49′20″W
- Built: 1903
- Architects: Archie Gillis & Angus, August J. Smith
- Architectural style: Italianate, Second Renaissance Revival
- NRHP reference No.: 72000272
- CSRHP No.: 5EP.190

Significant dates
- Added to NRHP: 1972
- Designated CSRHP: September 29, 1972

The Colorado Springs Pioneers Museum is located at 215 S. Tejon Street in Colorado Springs, Colorado, United States. The granite building with a domed clock tower was the El Paso County Courthouse building from 1903 to 1973. The museum, which moved to this location in 1979, has fine arts, artifacts and archival collections that document the Pikes Peak region. The building is on the National Register of Historic Places, and was the 2nd property to be listed in El Paso County, after Pikes Peak.

Located within Alamo Square Park the museum is also home to the Starsmore Center for Local History, a manuscript collection and research facility.

== Collection ==
The museum's mission is to "build a lasting connection to the Pikes Peak region by preserving and sharing our cultural history," which is accomplished through a wide variety of temporary and long-term exhibits, tours, programs, lectures and special events.

The more than 60,000 objects in the museum's collection include cultural and historic artifacts. Artifacts from Arapaho, Cheyenne and Ute cultures are included in the Native American collection. Helen Hunt Jackson's house is partially represented in the museum with possessions that she owned. The collection includes items relating to the city's founding, mining industry, military installations and health resort industry. Van Briggle Pottery, regional art and a "nationally significant collection of quilts" are part of the collection. The museum has won local and national awards for excellence and is fully accredited by the American Association of Museums.

Eric Bransby created a mural that depicts the Pikes Peak region's history from early Native Americans to the United States Air Force Academy construction.

There is a museum store. Admission to the museum is free. Its mission is to "collect, preserve, research, and interpret the history and culture of the Pikes Peak Region."

== Starsmore Center for Local History ==
Within the museum is the Starsmore Center for Local History which has a Pikes Peak Region research library and archives. The collection includes images, newspapers, manuscript collections and city directories. Personal papers of General William Jackson Palmer, the city's founder are also included in the center's collection.

== Alamo Park ==
It is situated within the Alamo Square Park which features several history-themed sculptures, flower beds and a gazebo. There is also a preserved 1900 E. Howard & Co. street clock that was saved from destruction during urban renewal in the 1960s and relocated from its original home several blocks away.

== See also ==
- History of Colorado Springs, Colorado
