= Bear Creek Cañon Park =

Coordinates: 38°49′26.79″N 104°53′8.98″W

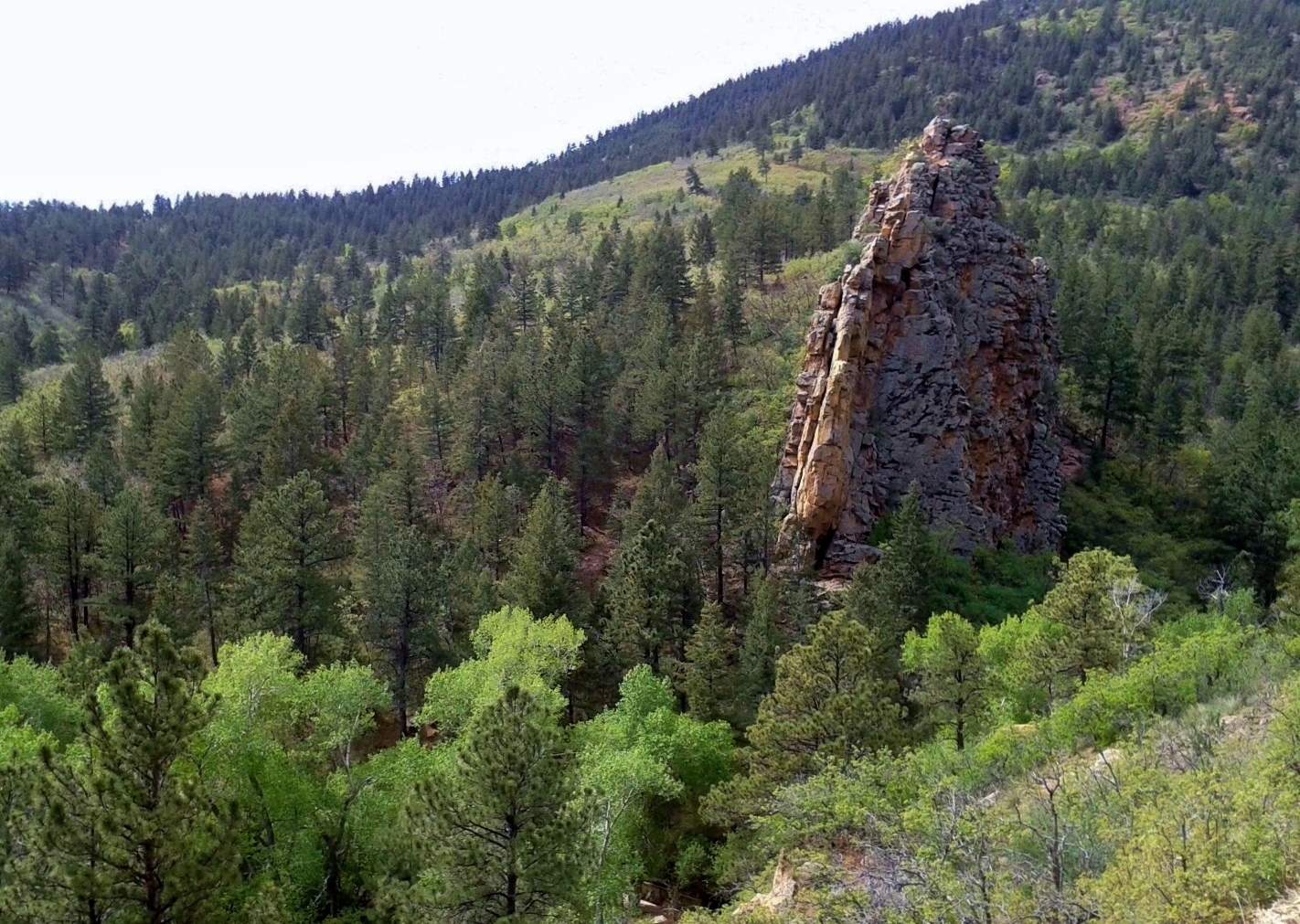
Bear Creek Cañon Park - View of rock formation in the park, May's Peak in the background

Bear Creek Cañon Park is a high-country park located in Colorado Springs, Colorado with steep trails for hiking, mountain biking and horseback riding.

A trail in the western edge of the Bear Creek Regional Park connects to the high-country Bear Creek Cañon Park.

== History ==
General William Jackson Palmer donated land to establish the park, along with other Colorado Springs parks, such as Monument Valley Park, North Cheyenne Cañon Park, Palmer Park, Pioneer Square (South) Park, and Prospect Lake. He donated a total of 1,270 acres (510 ha) of land.

In 1873, and for many years, the only trail up to the Pikes Peak Signal Station started in Manitou Springs and went through Bear Creek Cañon. The 17-mile (27 km) trail also passed through Seven Lakes, Jones Park and the past Lake House at Lake Morraine areas.

== Park ==
The park, located at 501 Bear Creek Road, has trails for hiking and mountain biking. There is a picnic area with picnic tables.

== Gallery ==
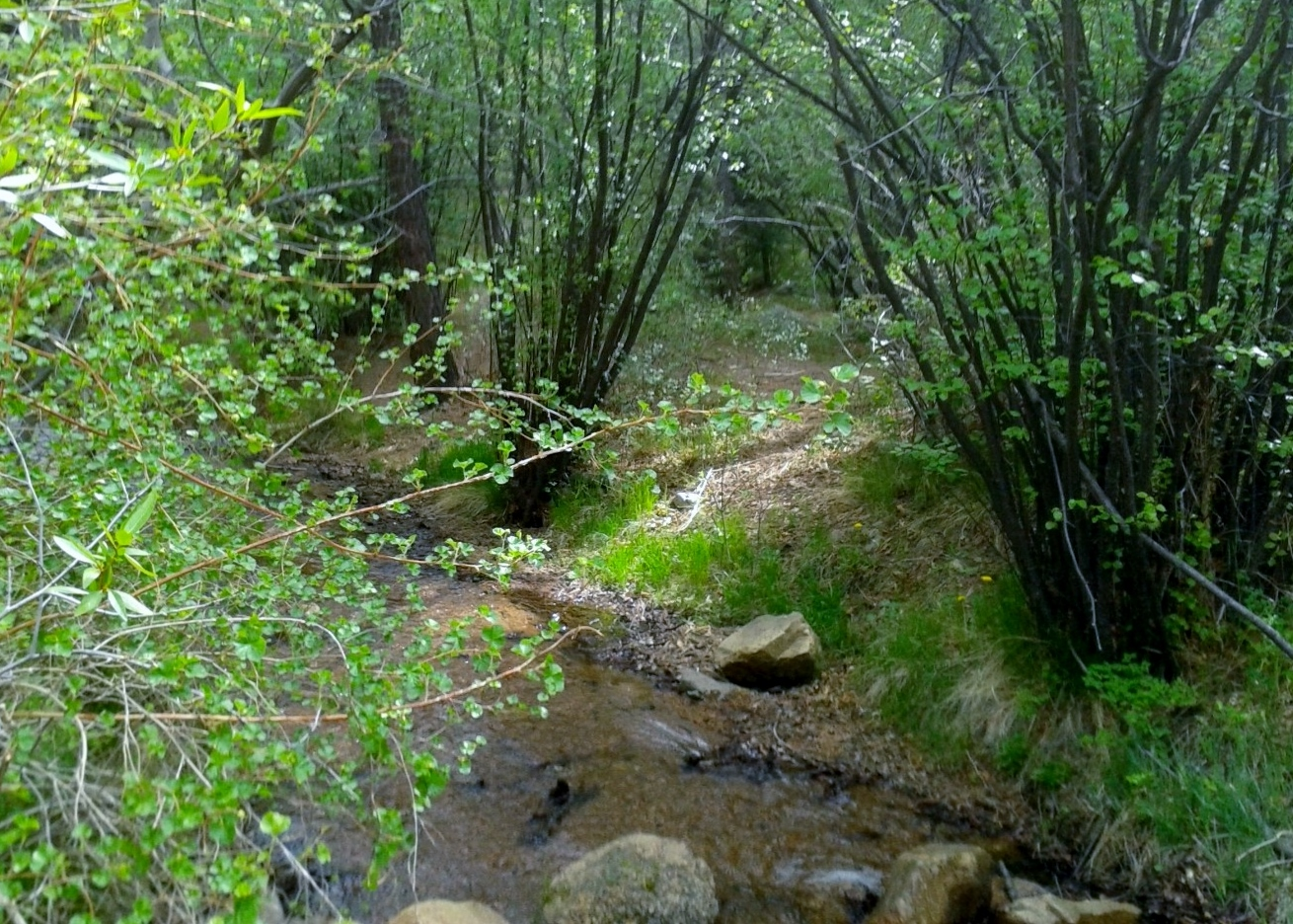
Bear Creek Cañon Park - Bear Creek, just off Bear Creek Road

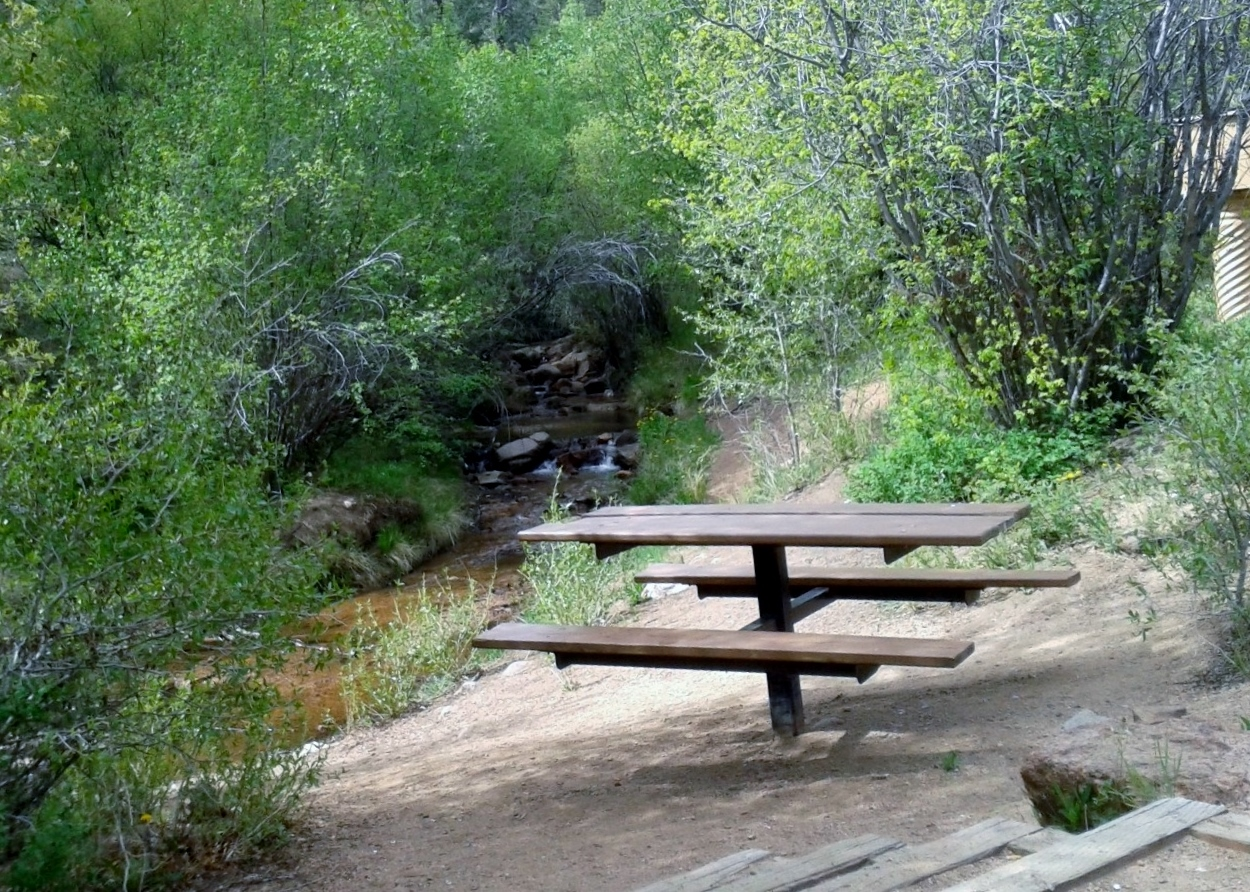
Bear Creek Cañon Park - Bear Creek and Picnic Area

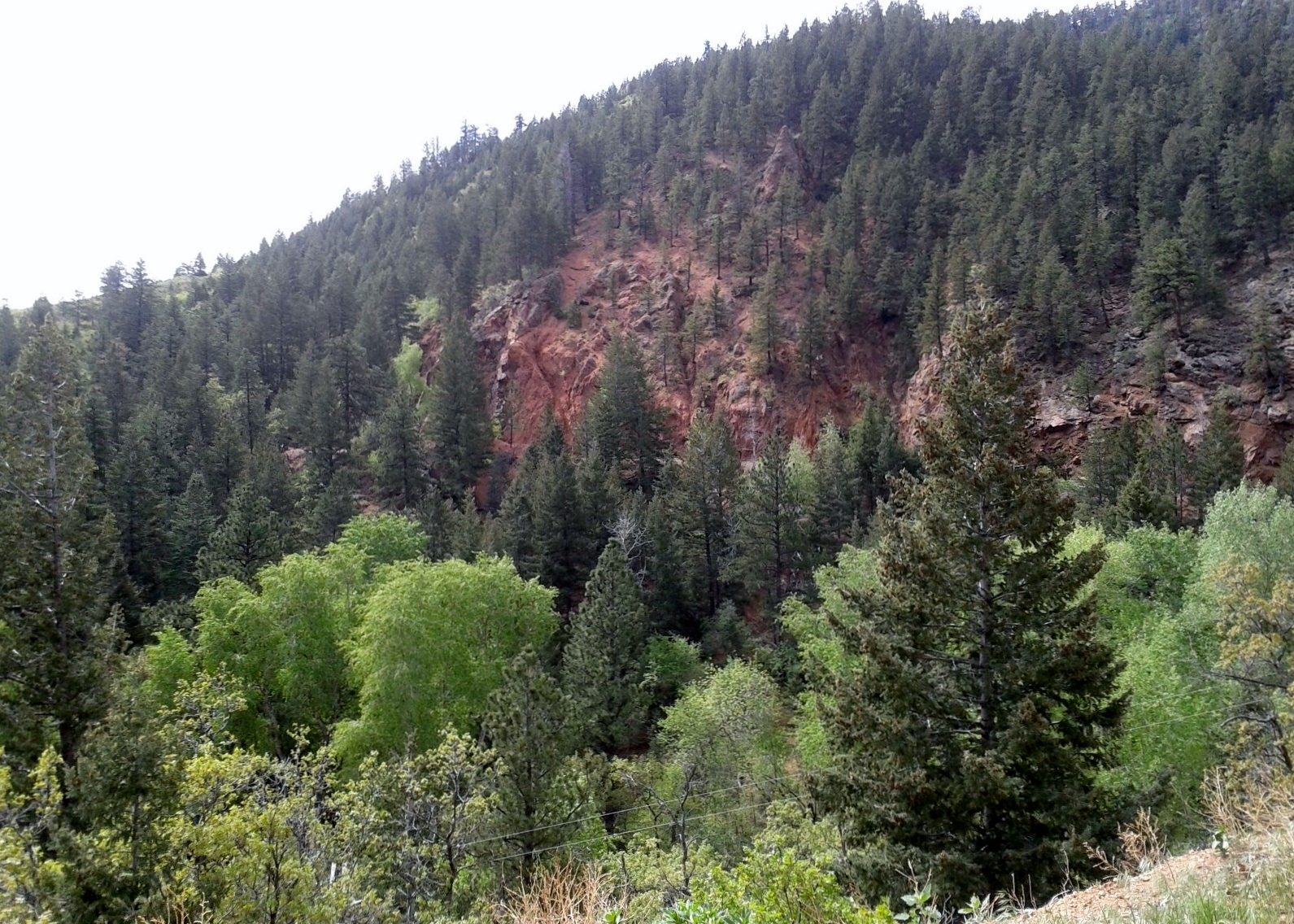
Bear Creek Cañon Park - View across the top of Bear Creek Cañon to Old Gold Camp Road
