= Memorial Park, Colorado Springs =

Park in Colorado Springs, Colorado, United States

Coordinates: 38°49′58.94″N 104°47′51.36″W

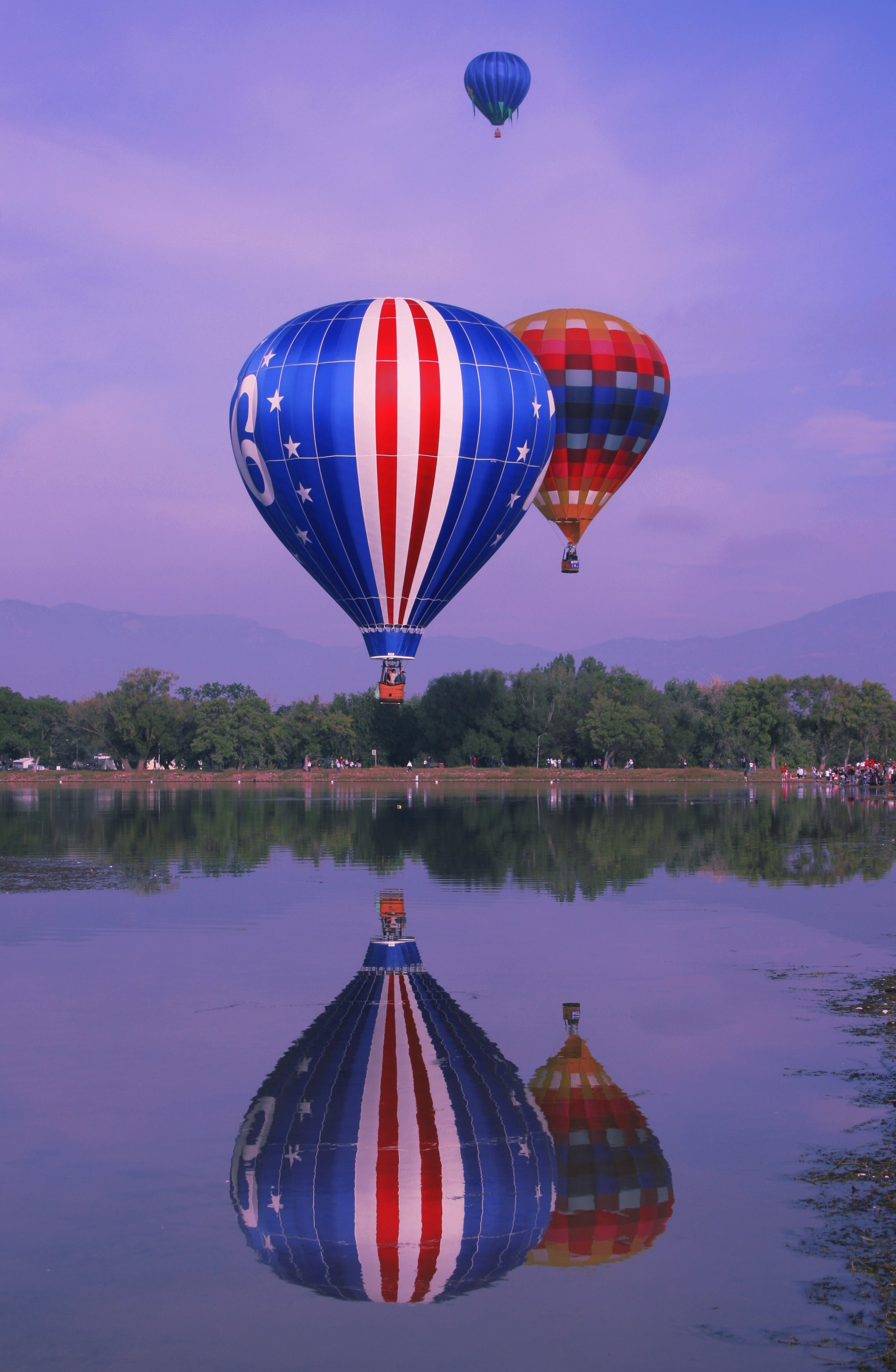
Colorado Balloon Classic 2009, Labor Day Weekend, Prospect Lake in Memorial Park.

Memorial Park or Memorial Community Park is a community park in Colorado Springs, Colorado. It has a wide range of sports facilities, including an indoor and outdoor pool, a recreation center, trails and Prospect Lake.

Colorado and the Rocky Mountain region's largest balloon festival has been held on Labor Day weekend at Memorial Park since 1977.

== History ==
General William Jackson Palmer donated land with Prospect Lake to establish the park, along with other Colorado Springs parks, such as Monument Valley Park, North Cheyenne Cañon, Palmer Park, Pioneer Square (South) Park, and Bear Creek Cañon Park. He donated a total of 1,270 acres (510 ha) of land.

== Park facilities ==
Memorial Park, located at 1605 E. Pikes Peak Avenue, has 3 baseball and softball fields, basketball court, boating, exercise course, fishing, football field, horseshoe pits, in-line hockey court, mountain biking, playground, 15 football and soccer fields, swimming pool, 12 tennis courts, bicycle racing track, roller skate racing track and volleyball court facilities. There is public ice skating and skating lessons at the Mark "Pa" Sertich Ice Center. There is a 1.25-mile (2.01 km) fitness trail, a 2.2-mile (3.5 km) perimeter trail, and a 0.6-mile (0.97 km) criterium trail within the park. Around the park are two 5-kilometer (3.1 mi) trails. It also has picnic tables and a picnic shelter. The park is handicapped / ADA accessible, including a wheelchair accessible fishing dock and an ADA accessible playground. The park sits on 196 acres (79 ha). It is best accessed from South Union Boulevard.

There are vending machines, public telephones, restrooms and concession stands at the park.

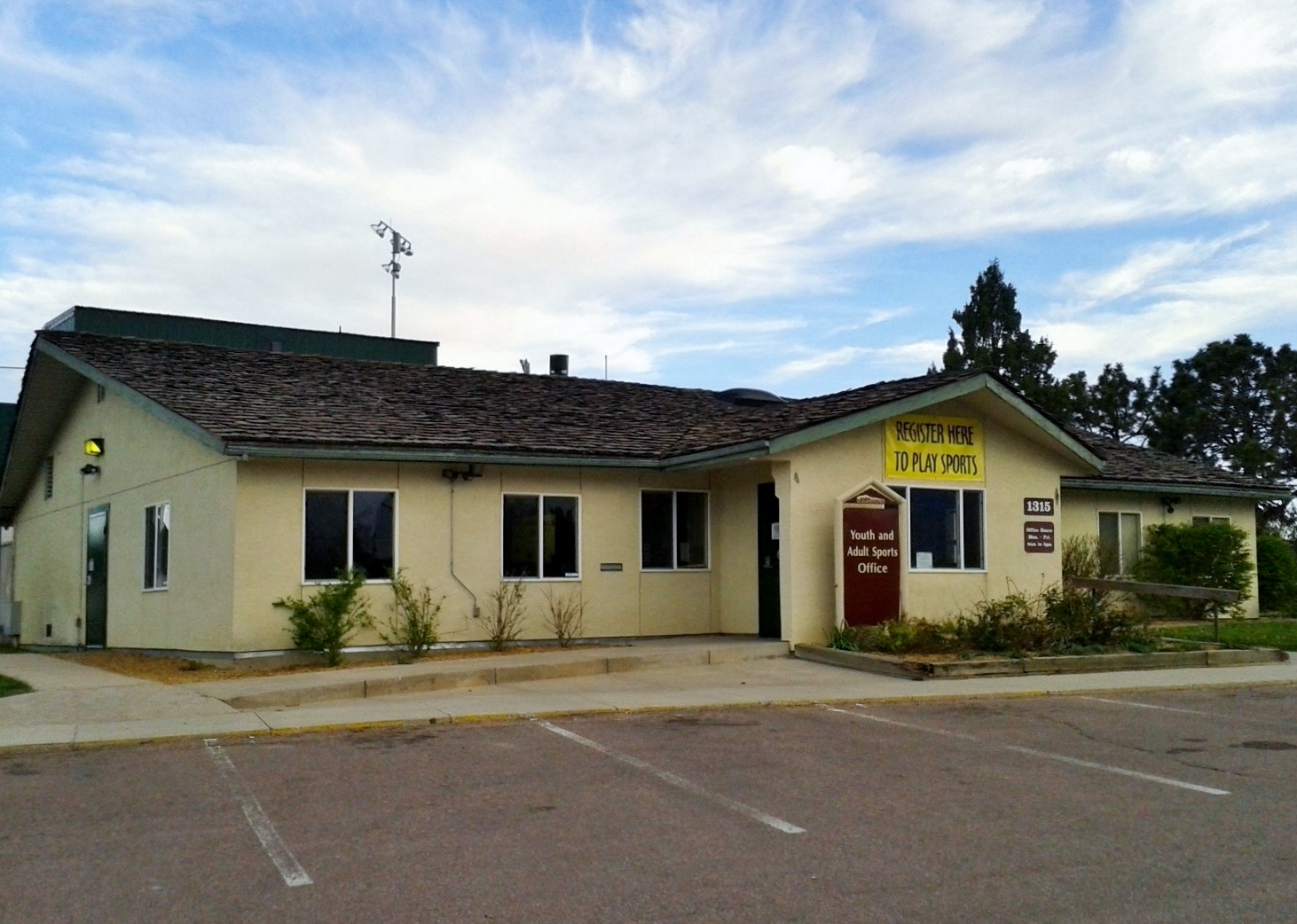
Memorial Park, Colorado Springs - Youth and Adult Sports Office

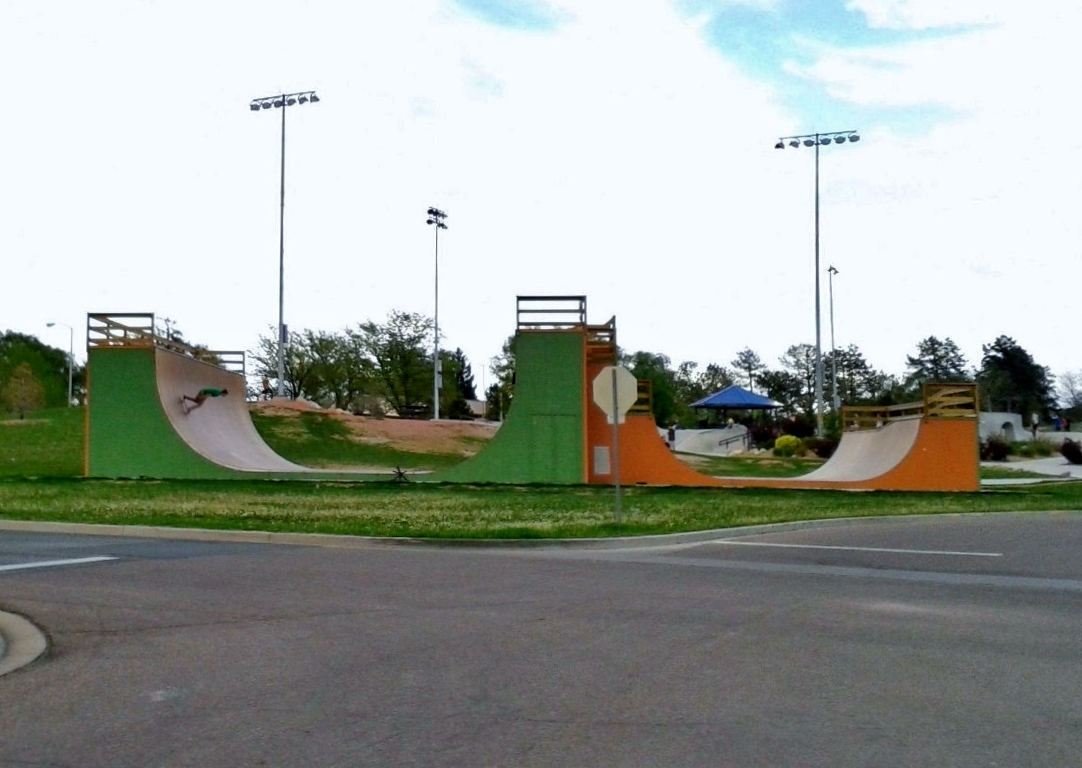
Memorial Park, Colorado Springs - Skateboarders

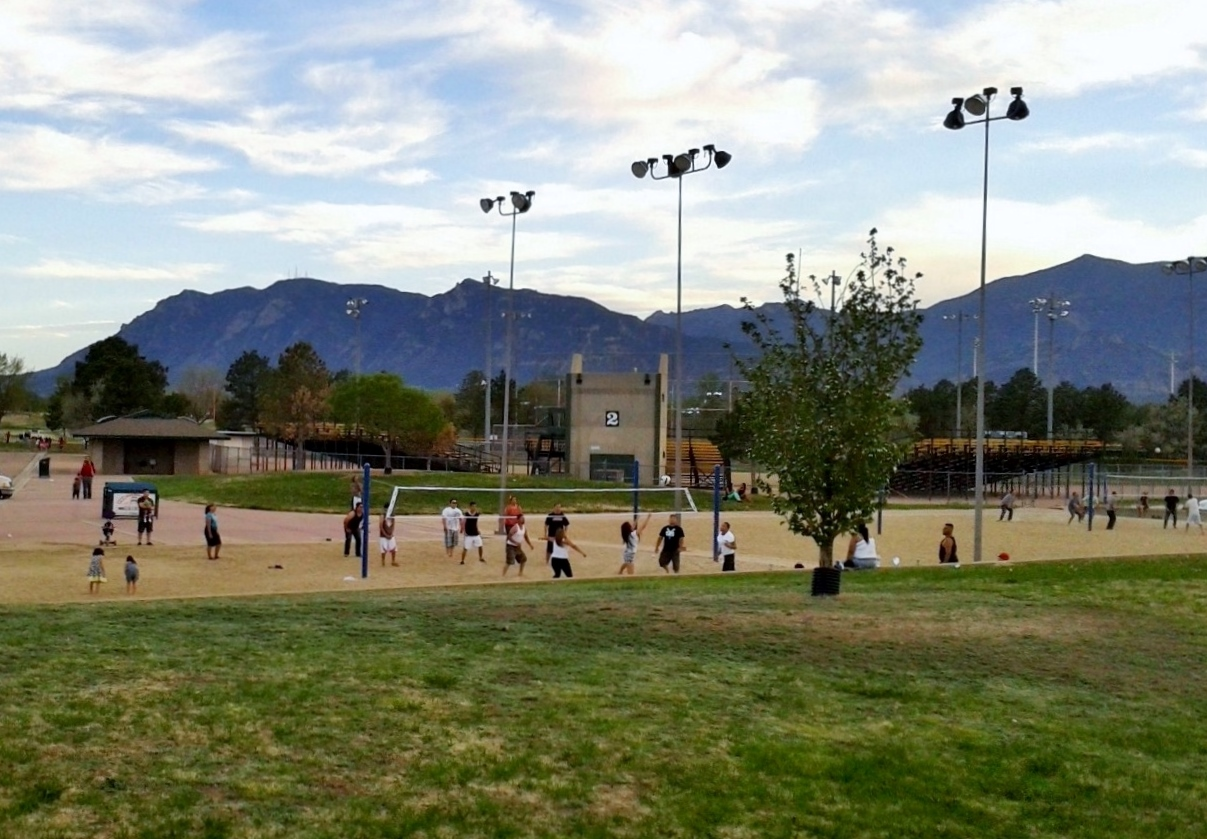
Memorial Park, Colorado Springs - Playfield

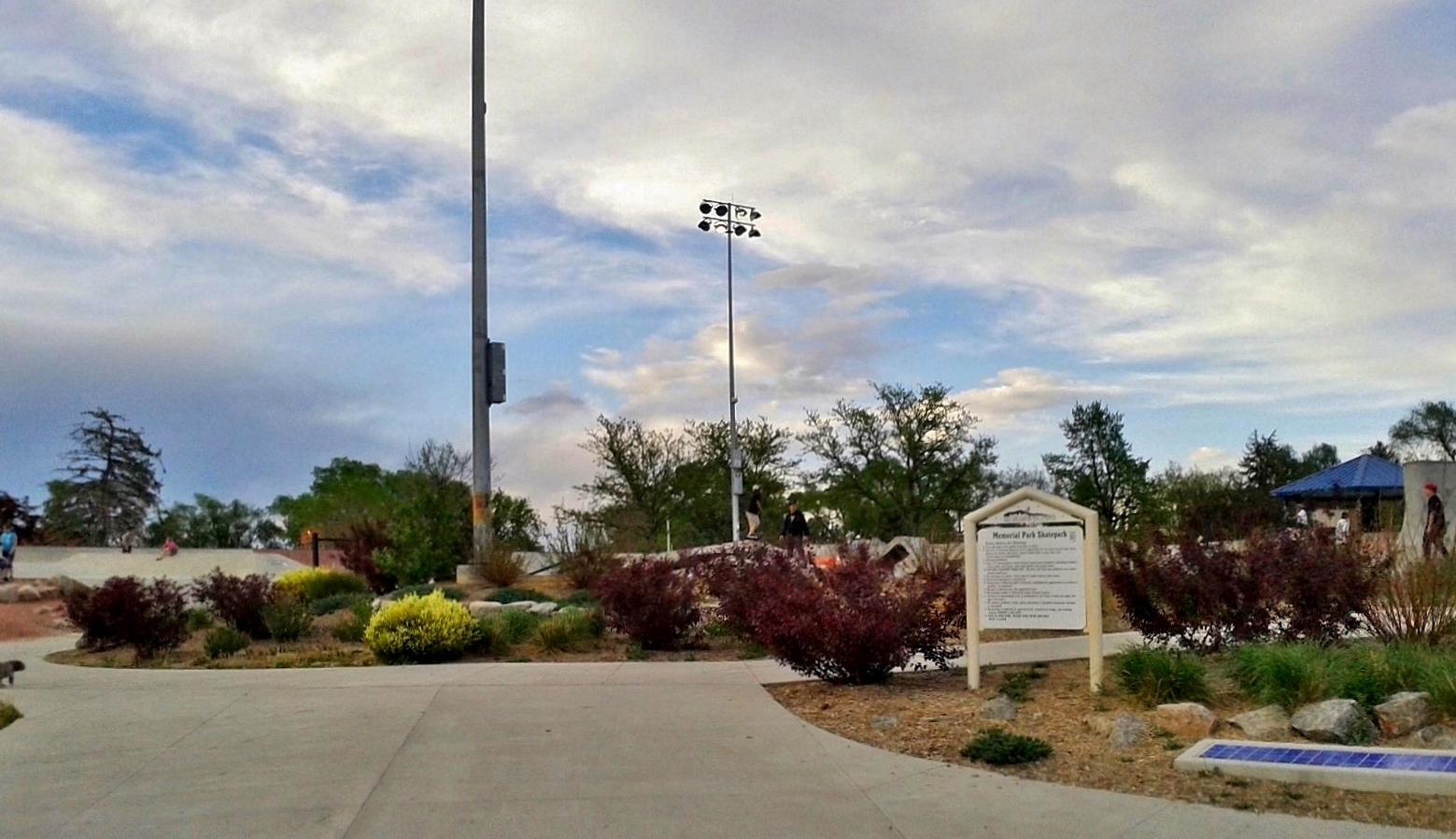
Memorial Park, Colorado Springs - Skatepark

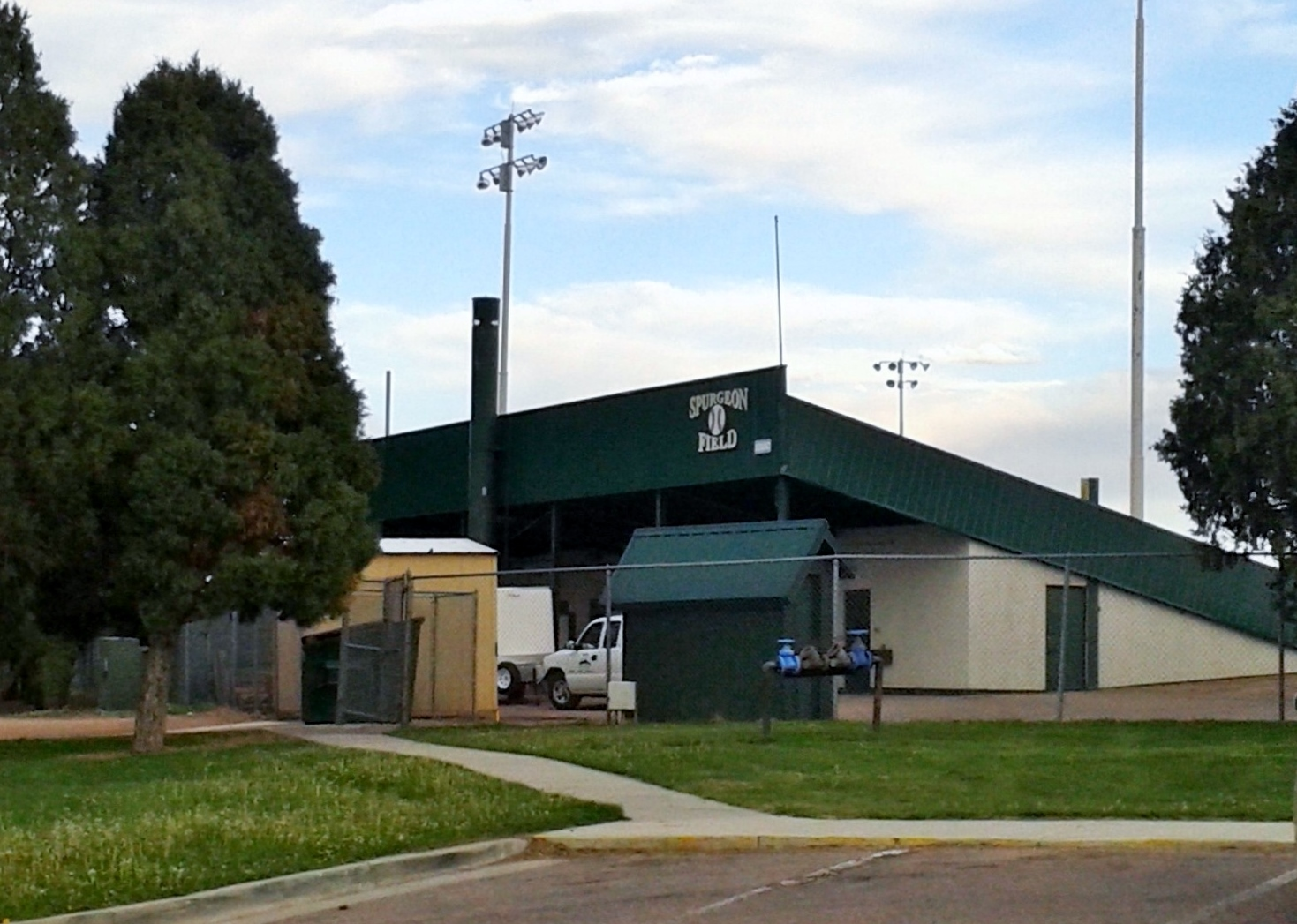
Memorial Park, Colorado Springs - Spurgeon Field

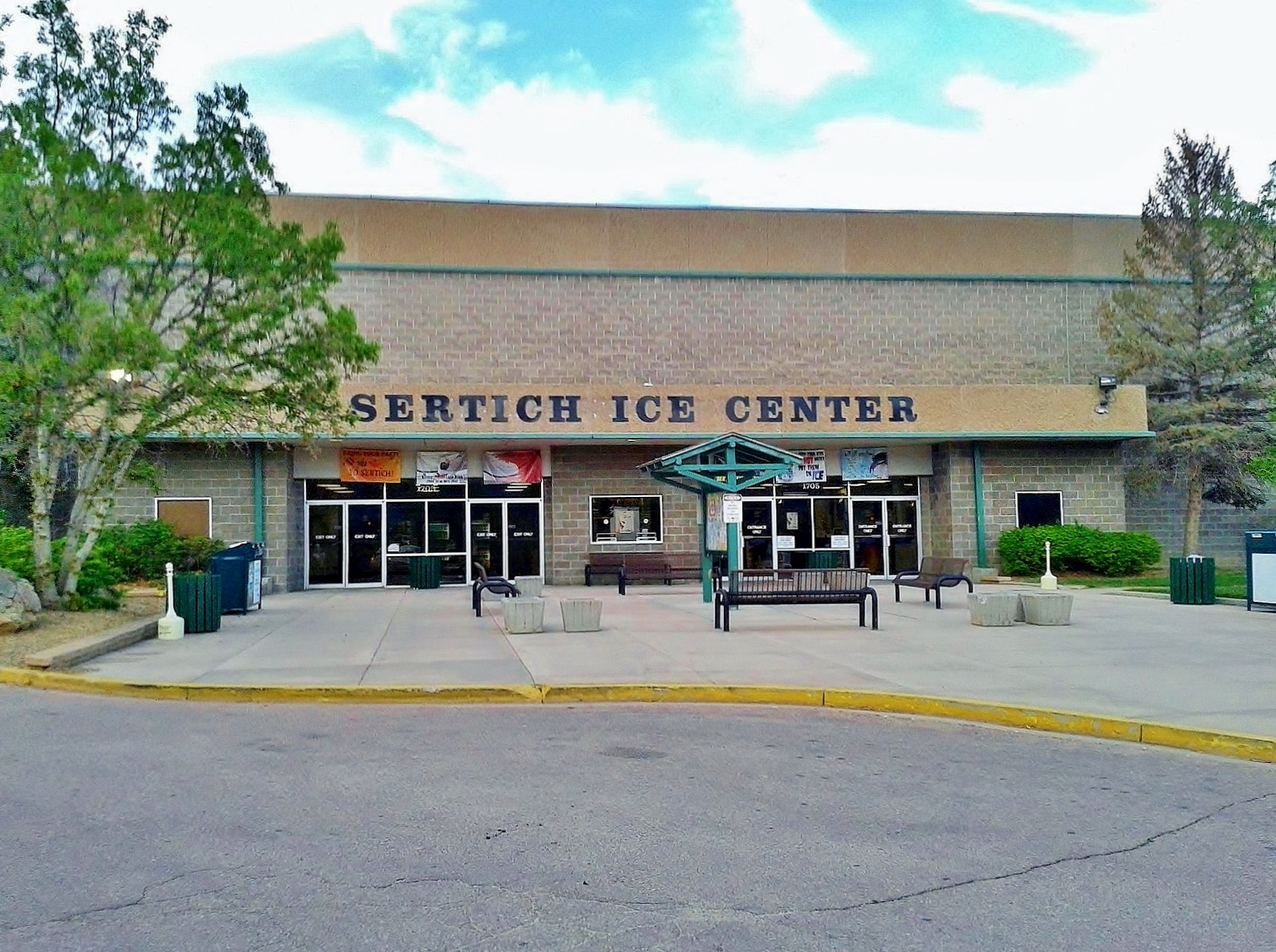
Memorial Park, Colorado Springs - Sertich Ice Center

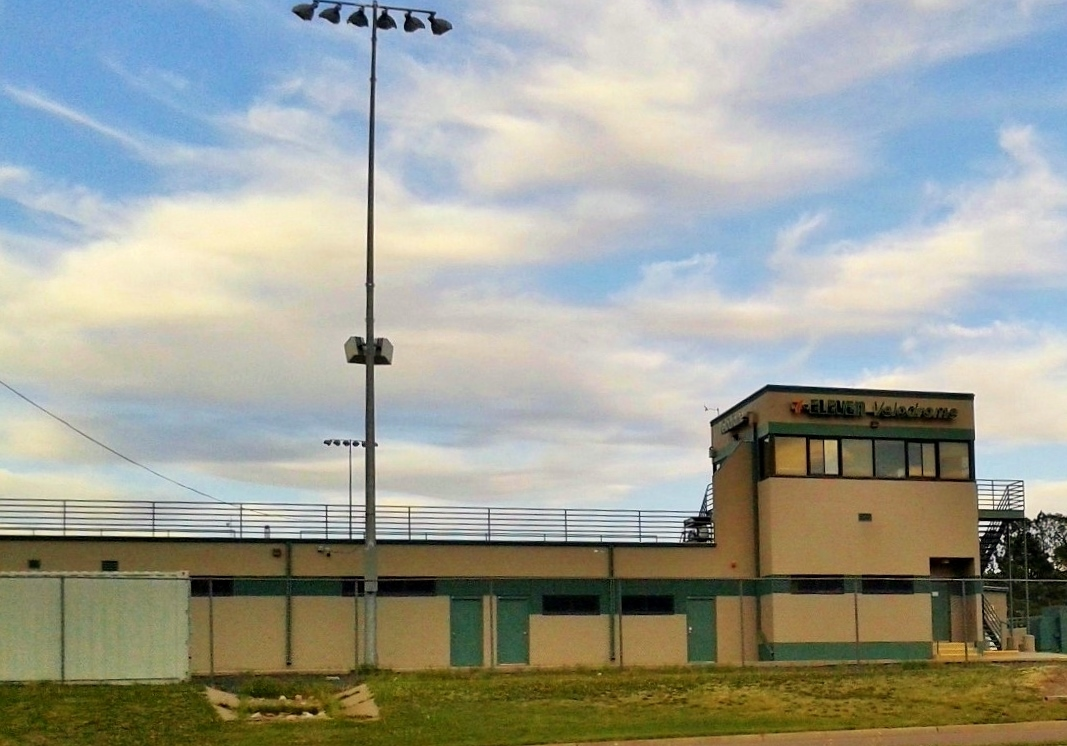
Memorial Park, Colorado Springs - 7 Eleven Velodome

== Prospect Lake ==
Swimming, boating and fishing can be enjoyed at Prospect Lake. A bathhouse is located near the beach for swimming. There are two fishing areas and one wheelchair accessible fishing dock.

Both non-motorized and motorized boats may operate on the lake. Sail boats, canoes, row boats and paddle boats may be rented at the park.

There is a 1.25-mile (2.01 km) fitness trail at Prospect Lake.

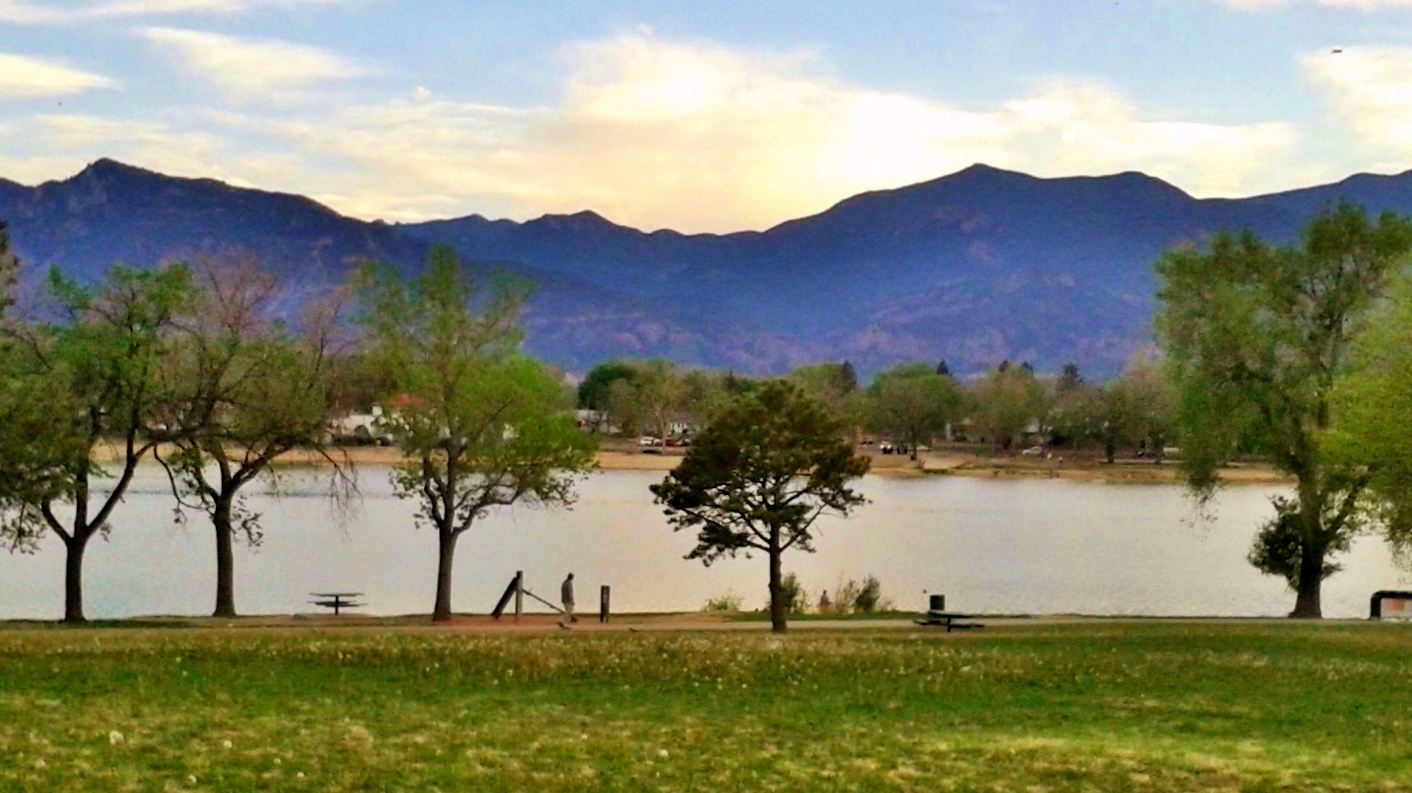
Memorial Park, Colorado Springs - Prospect Lake

== Memorial Park Recreation Center ==
The YMCA once operated the city-owned Memorial Park Recreation Center, but closed it in 2013 until further notice due to structural concerns. It was included in a YMCA membership and is no longer open to the public. Facilities included workout equipment and lap swims during pool hours. Brunch breaks were held the second Wednesday of each month from 10 to noon for members and patrons.

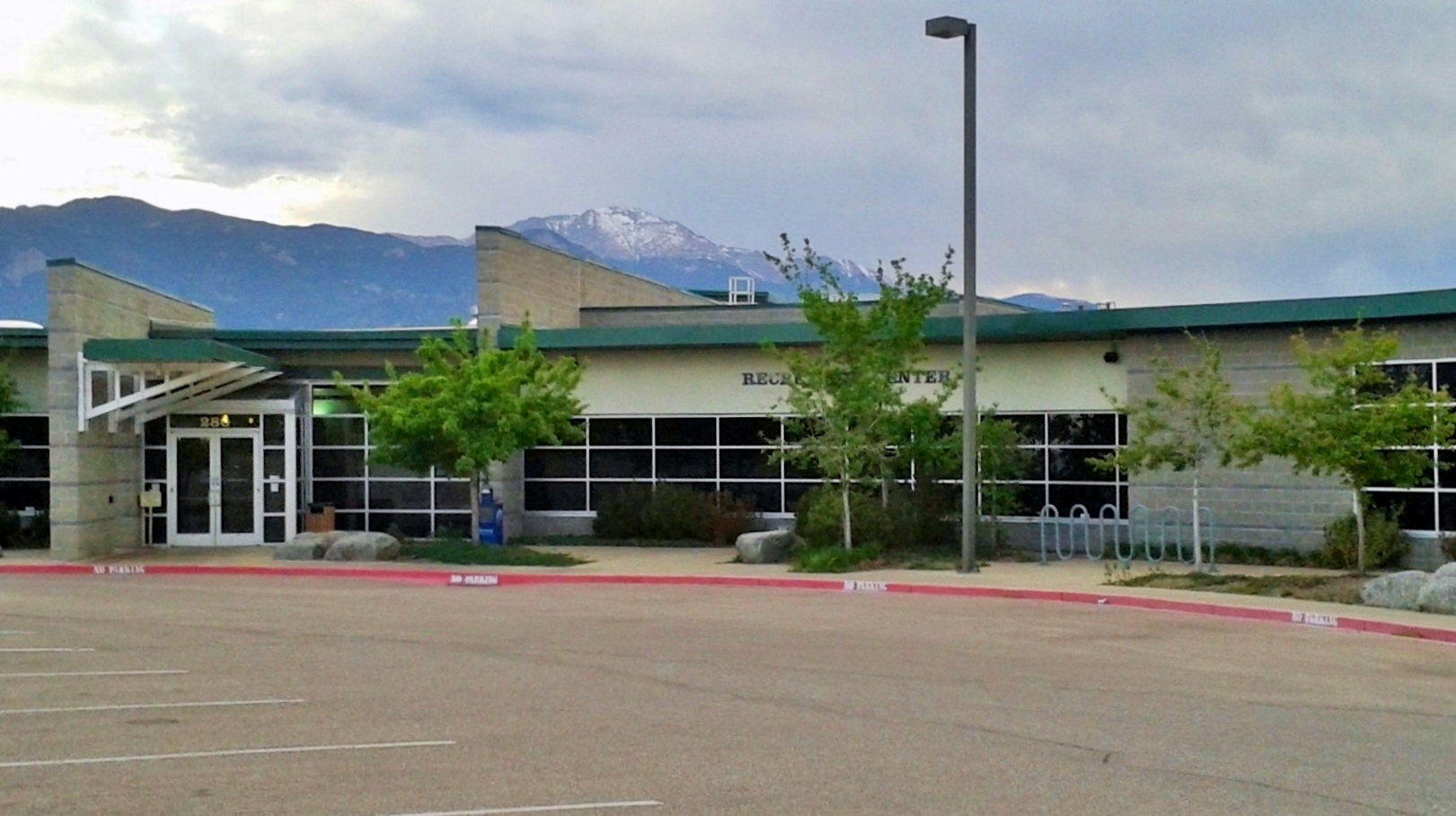
Memorial Park, Colorado Springs - Recreation Center

=== Aquatics Center ===
The Memorial Park Recreation Center's 25-yard indoor pool offered free swim and swim lessons year-around, except holidays. There were locker rooms, showers, and a hot tub. YMCA conducted CPR and lifeguard classes there. It was available for after-hours rentals.

=== Healthy Living Center ===
The Healthy Living Center had free weights, elliptical machines, treadmills, weight machines, recumbent bikes, medicine balls and bands for physical fitness training. It was open to people 14 years of age and older.

=== Silver Sneakers group exercise ===
Classes for seniors included aqua fitness classes and a Muscular Strength and Range of Movement class.

=== Mind, Exercise, Nutrition, Do It! ===
The Mind, Exercise, Nutrition, Do It! (MEND) 10-week program for 7- to 13-year-old children normally started in June.

== Outdoor swimming pool ==
The swimming pool was open 7 days a week in the summer, starting the day after Memorial Day, but is no longer open to the public. In a large grassy area nearby are picnic tables.

== Pavilions ==
Three pavilions, that accommodates 50 people each, are located in the southwest section of the park, near Costilla Street and Hancock Avenue. Tennis courts, basketball courts, there is one playground at the pavilion site and three additional playgrounds, and play fields are near the pavilion or in the park. Prospect Lake is encircled by a jogging trail. Amenities include access to a grill at each pavilion and restrooms are available during the summer with reservations. There is no electricity.

== Events ==
Events at the park include:

- April: Skyfall 5k and Sky Diving Demo
- June: Get Outdoors Day, Water Lantern Festival
- September: Labor Day Liftoff, Fallen Fire Fighter Memorial, Walk to End Alzheimer's
