= Stratton Open Space =

Protected area in Colorado Springs, USA

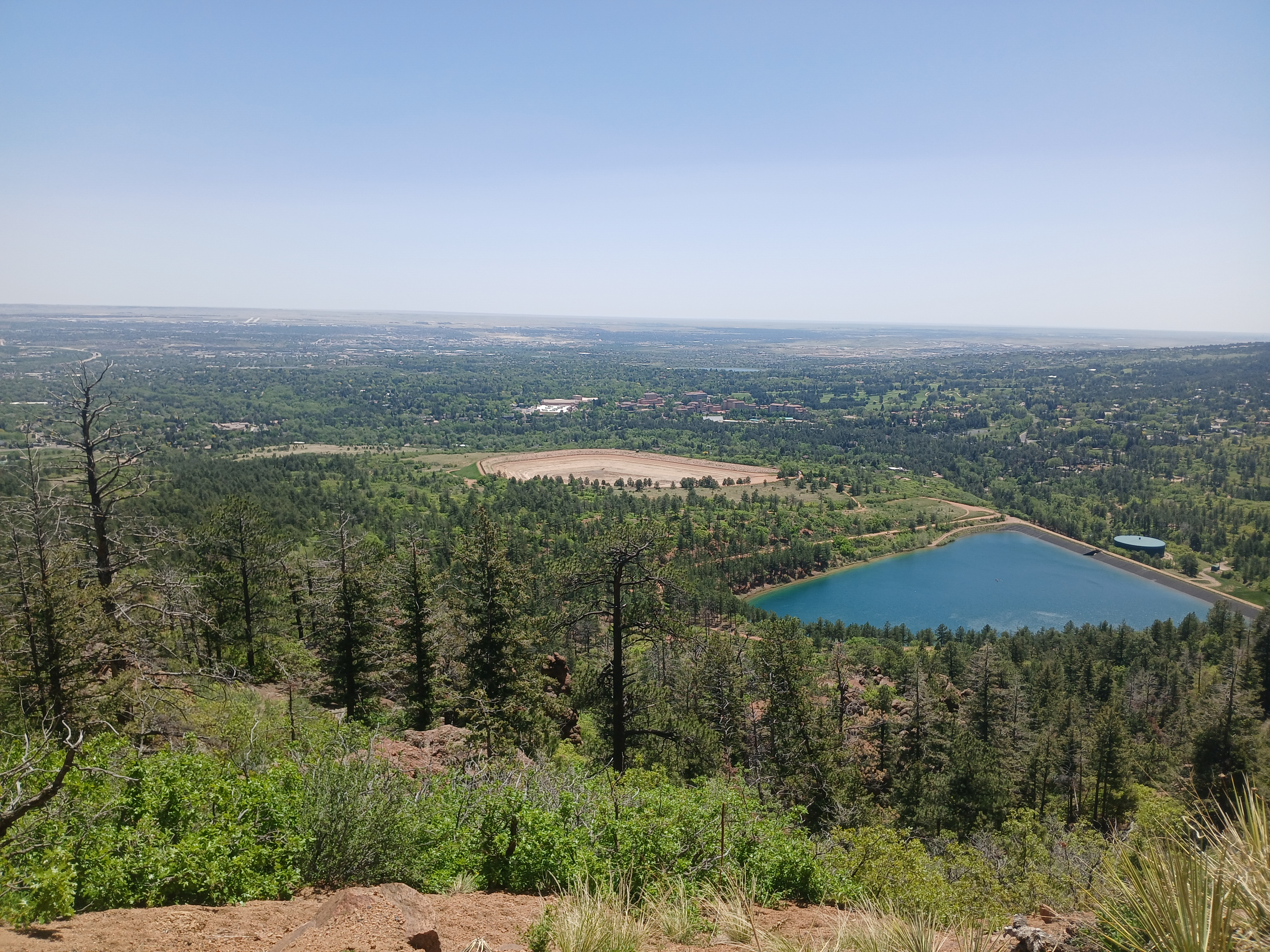
- Stratton Open Open Space, located in Colorado Springs, Colorado
- Interactive map of Stratton Open Space
- Nearest city: Colorado Springs
- Coordinates: 38°47′53″N 104°52′01″W
- Established: 1998

Stratton Open Space is a 318-acre recreational park and historic preservation located in the city of Colorado Springs, Colorado. The park is one of a total of nine open spaces operating under the city's jurisdiction.

Stratton Open Space first opened in 1998 and is free to the public. The park includes a total of 15 miles of trails, and is located within Pikes Peak National Forest. The park is less than a mile from Cheyenne Mountain High School.

== See also ==
- Red Rock Canyon Open Space
- Cheyenne Mountain High School
