= Banning Lewis Ranch =

Coordinates: 38°53′45″N 104°38′50″W

- Location within Colorado

General information
- Type: Cattle ranch
- Location: Colorado Springs, United States
- Current tenants: Raymond W. Lewis and Ruth Banning Lewis

Technical details
- Size: 30,000 acres (12,000 ha)

Banning-Lewis Ranches was a successful cattle-ranching operation located east of Colorado Springs, managed by Raymond W. Lewis and Ruth Banning Lewis. The Lewises eventually acquired more than 30,000 acres on which Colorado Domino Type Herefords were raised. They won the Colorado Soil Conservation program award in 1948.

The city limits of Colorado Springs were extended to encompass Banning Lewis Ranch in 1988. Efforts to develop the ranch into a residential community that could house up to 175,000 residents, and/or perform oil and gas exploration, initially had limited success. 300 homes were built on the northwest corner of the property, but the owners filed for bankruptcy in 2010. This lack of development was used as an argument against spending at least $2.1 billion to build the "Southern Delivery System" water pipeline. However, in 2015 the housing market in Colorado Springs exploded and many new houses, mostly in the $300-$500,000 price range were built with more under construction each day. As of 2023 Banning Lewis Ranch now has two charter schools: Banning Lewis Ranch Academy and Banning Lewis Preparatory Academy; and one public school: Inspiration View Elementary School; two activity centers, two pools, many walking trails and parks, a dog park, and both tennis and pickleball courts. Homes typically sell in the $350,000 to $850,000 range. It now has six villages and is one of the fastest-growing communities in Colorado Springs.
