= Colorado Springs, Colorado =

City in Colorado, US

Colorado Springs
- Home rule city
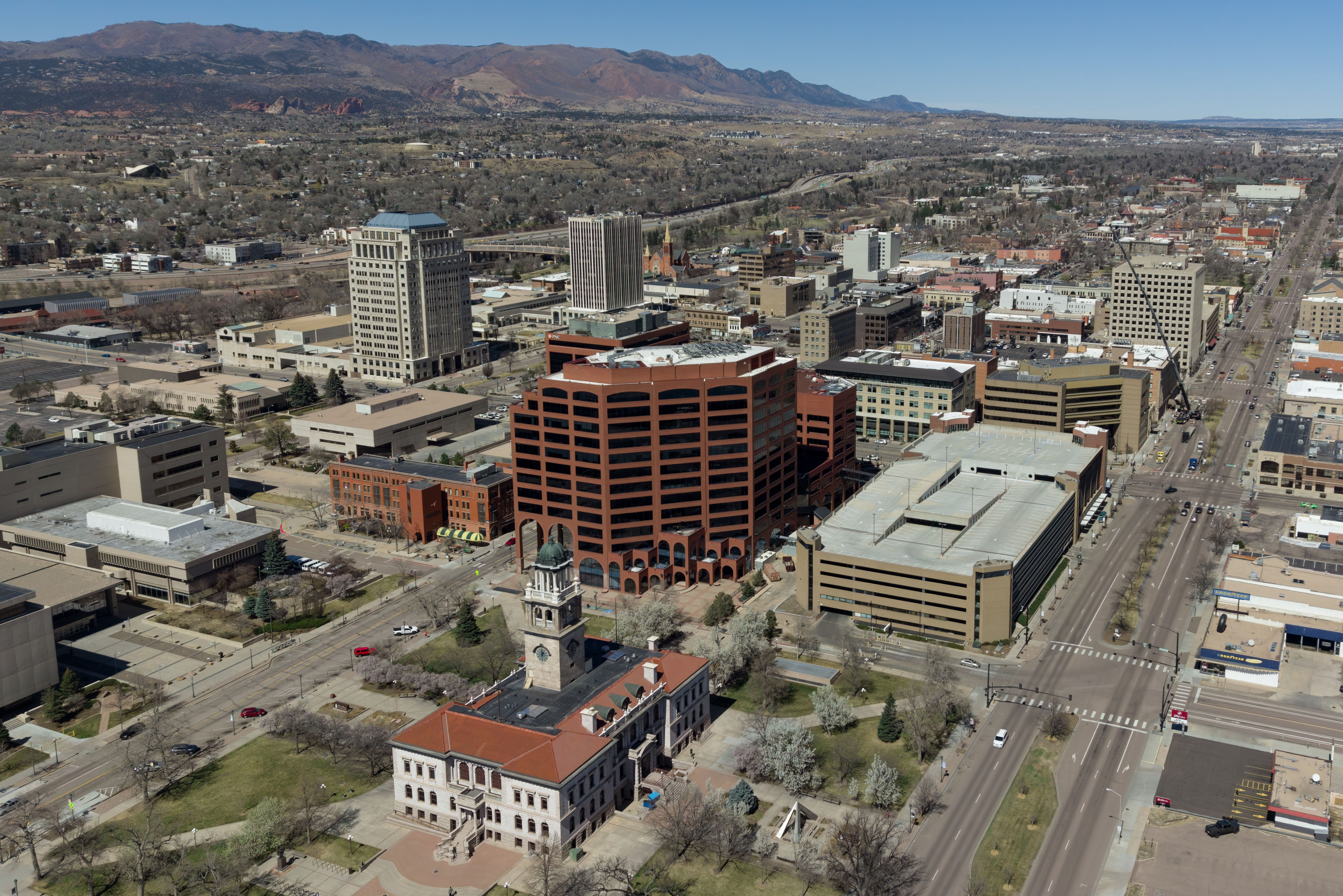
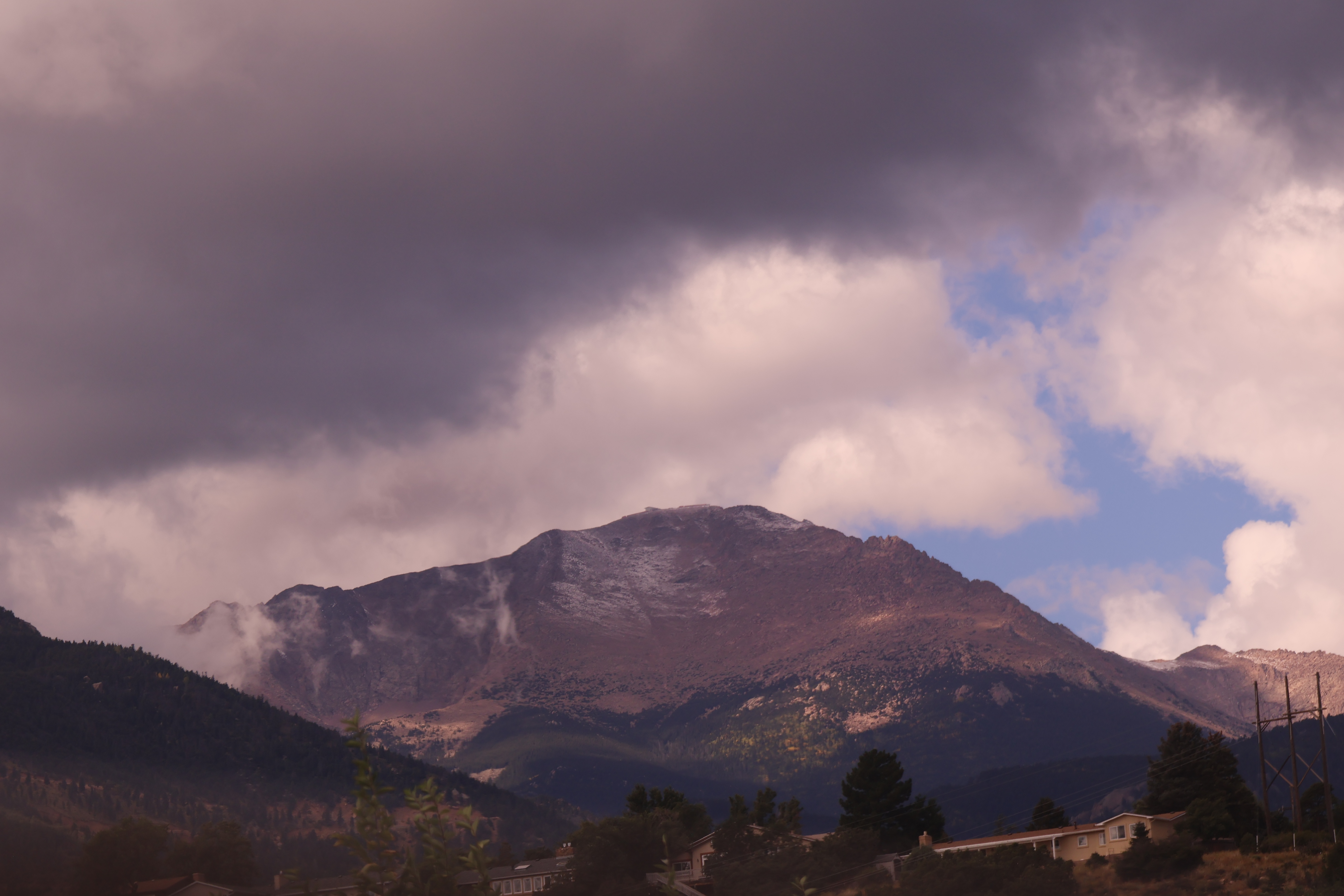
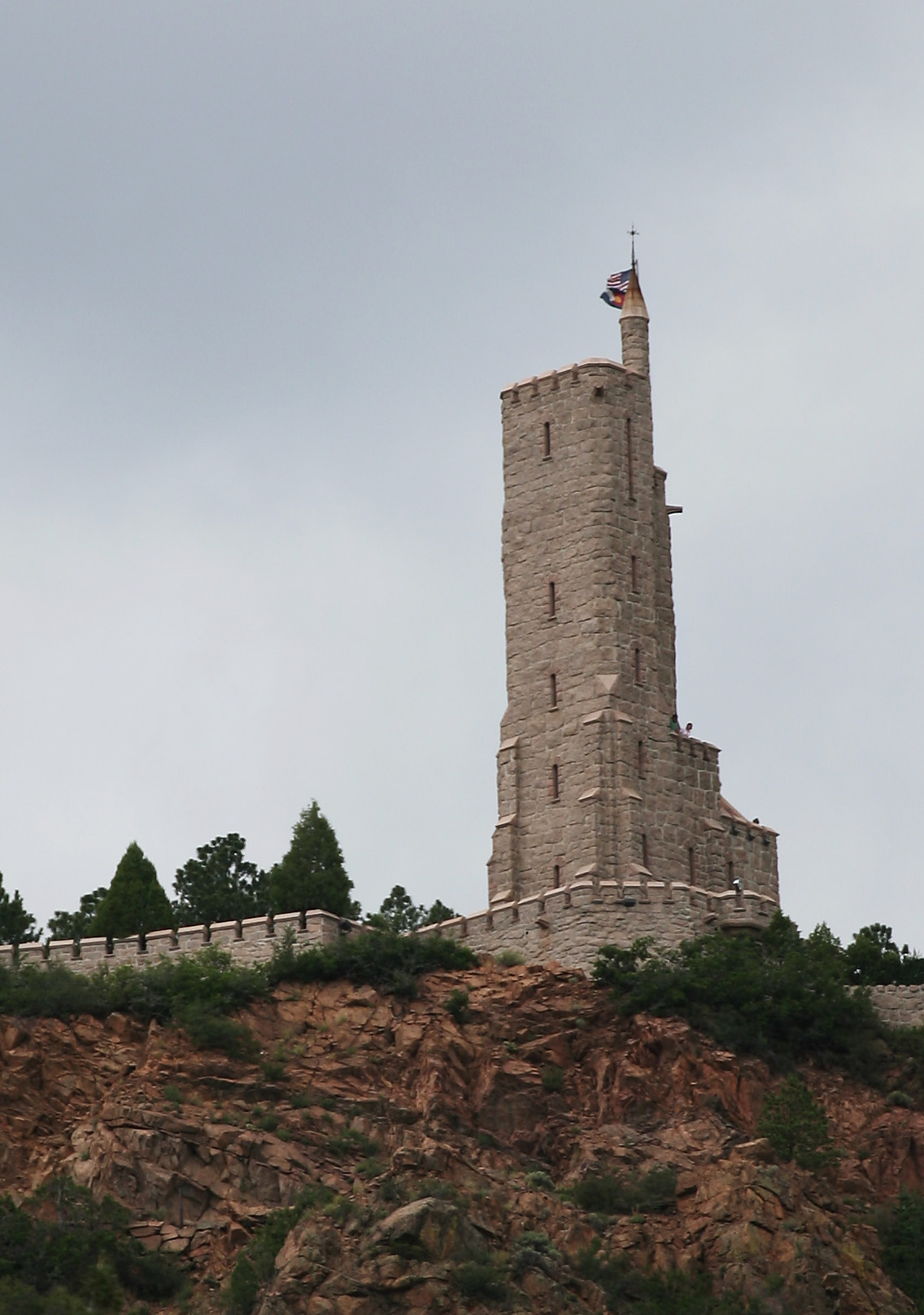
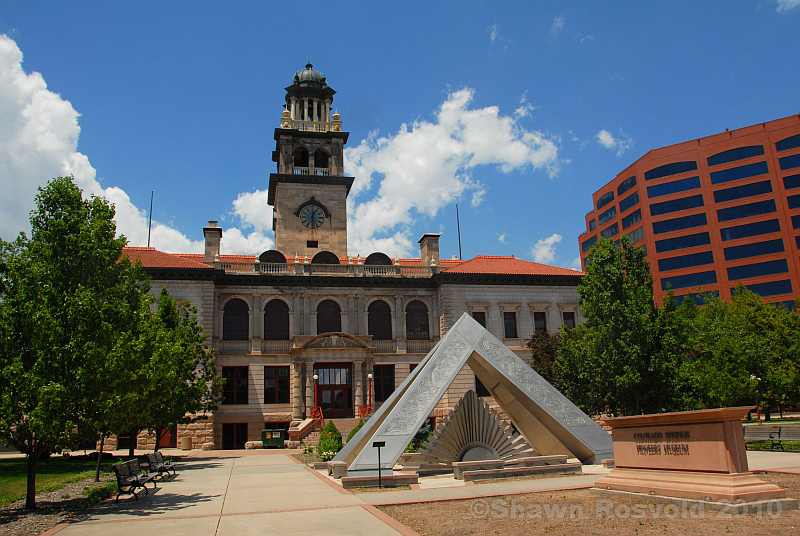
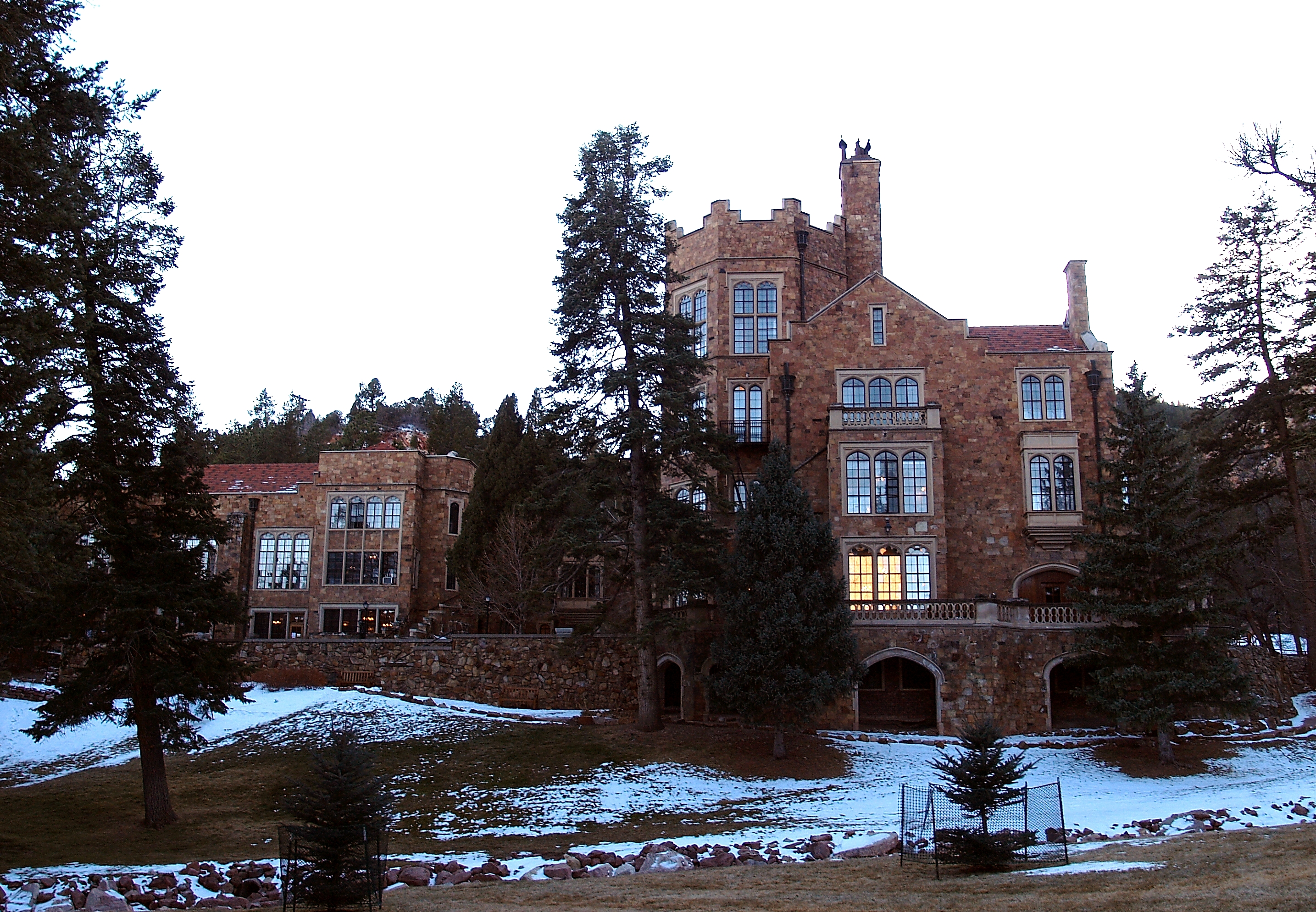
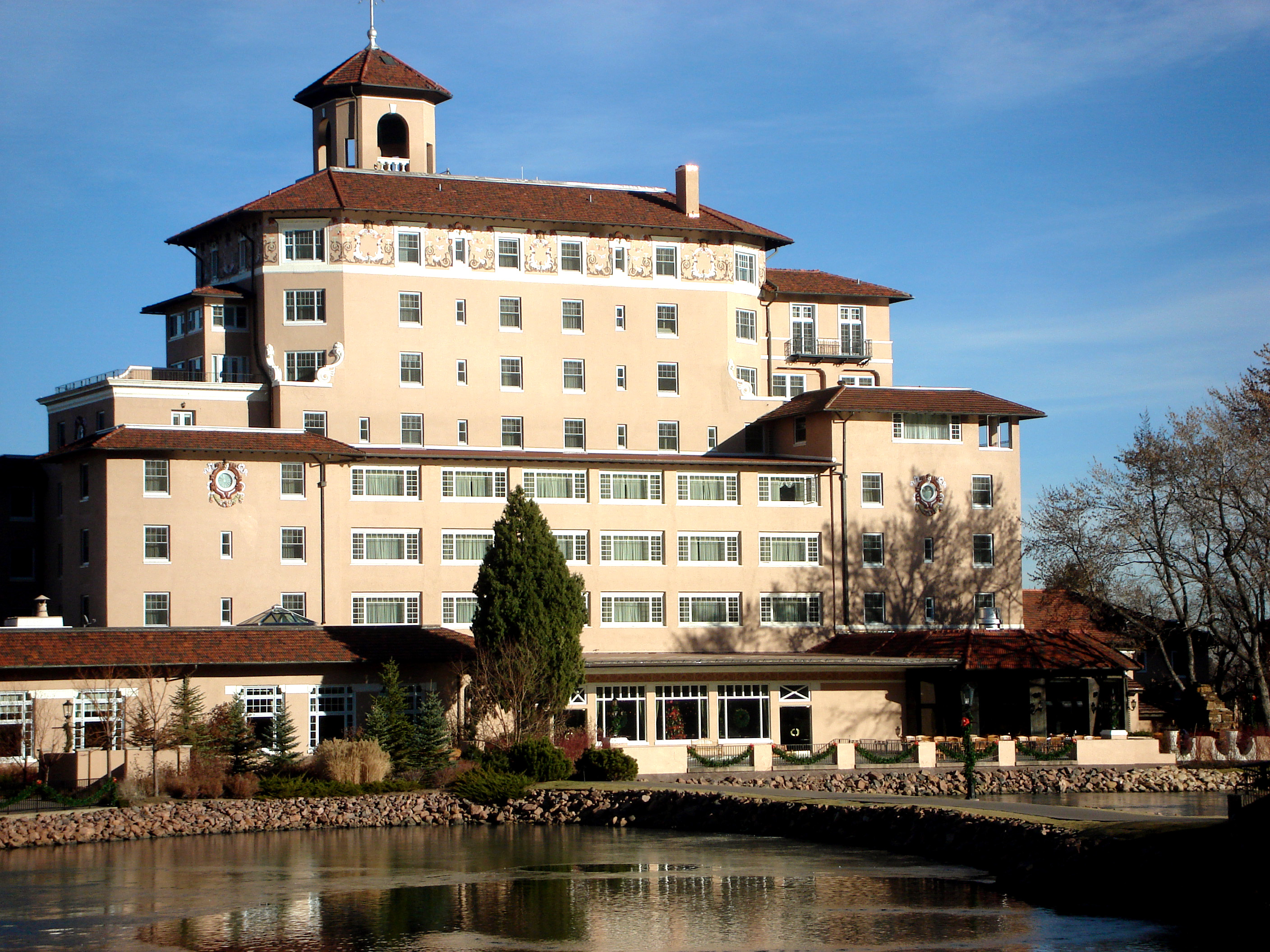
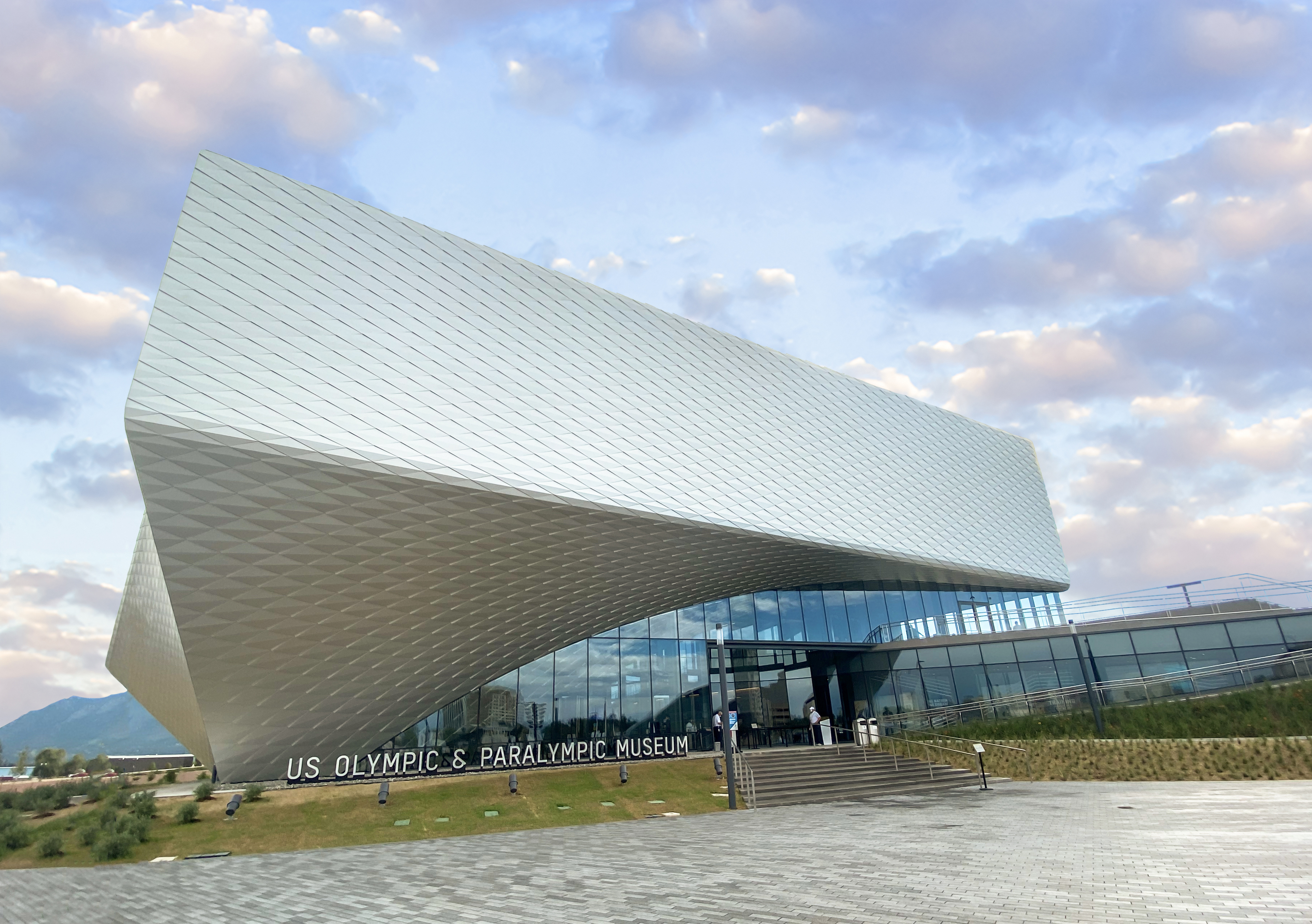
- Colorado Springs skyline and the Front Range Pikes Peak Will Rogers Shrine Pioneers Museum Glen Eyrie The Broadmoor United States Olympic & Paralympic Museum

- Flag Logo
- Nickname(s): Olympic City USA, The Springs
- Interactive map of Colorado Springs
- Location within Colorado Location within the United States
- Coordinates: 38°51′28″N 104°36′21″W
- Country: United States
- State: Colorado
- County: El Paso
- Incorporated: June 19, 1886; 140 years ago

Government
  - Type: Home rule city
  - Mayor: Yemi Mobolade (I)

Area
  - Total: 195.761 sq mi (507.019 km^{2})
  - Land: 195.399 sq mi (506.082 km^{2})
  - Water: 0.362 sq mi (0.937 km^{2})
- Elevation: 6,011 ft (1,832 m)

Population (2020)
  - Total: 478,961
  - Density: 2,451.19/sq mi (946.410/km^{2})
- Time zone: UTC−07:00 (MST)
  - Summer (DST): UTC−06:00 (MDT)
- ZIP code: 80901–80951, 80960, 80962, 80970, 80977, 80995, 80997
- Area code: 719
- GNIS city ID: 2410198
- FIPS code: FIPS 08 16000
- Website: coloradosprings.gov

Colorado Springs is a home rule city that is the county seat of and the most populous city in El Paso County, Colorado, United States. The city had a population of 478,961 at the 2020 census, a 15.02% increase since 2010. Colorado Springs is the second-most populous city and most extensive city by area in the state of Colorado, and the 40th-most-populous city in the United States. It is the principal city of the Colorado Springs metropolitan area, which had 755,105 residents in 2020, and the second-most prominent city of the Front Range Urban Corridor.

Colorado Springs is located in east-central Colorado on Fountain Creek, 70 miles (113 km) south of Denver. At 6,035 feet (1,839 m), the city sits over 1 mile (1.6 km) above sea level. It is near the base of Pikes Peak, which rises 14,115 feet (4,302.31 m) above sea level on the eastern edge of the Southern Rocky Mountains.

== History ==
The Ute, Arapaho and Cheyenne mountain peoples were the first recorded people to inhabit the area which would become Colorado Springs. Part of the territory included in the United States' 1803 Louisiana Purchase, the current city area was designated part of the 1854 Kansas Territory. In 1859, after the first local settlement was established, it became part of the Jefferson Territory on October 24 and of El Paso County on November 28. Colorado City at the Front Range confluence of Fountain and Camp creeks was "formally organized on August 13, 1859" during the Pikes Peak Gold Rush. The Colorado City, Kansas Territory, post office operated from March 24, 1860, until it closed as the Colorado City, Colorado, post office on June 30, 1917. Colorado City served as the capital of the Colorado Territory from November 5, 1861, until August 14, 1862, when the capital was moved to Golden.

In 1871 the Colorado Springs Company laid out the towns of La Font (later called Manitou Springs) and Fountain Colony, upstream and downstream respectively, of Colorado City. Later that year, the Fountain Colony was renamed Colorado Springs. The Colorado Springs, Colorado Territory post office opened on December 1, 1871. The El Paso County seat shifted from Colorado City in 1873 to the Town of Colorado Springs. So many immigrants from England had settled in Colorado Springs by the early 1870s that Colorado Springs was locally referred to as "Little London". The town of Colorado Springs was incorporated on June 19, 1886.

A second period of annexations occurred during 1889–90, which included Seavey's Addition, West Colorado Springs, East End, and another North End addition. In 1891 the Broadmoor Land Company built the Broadmoor suburb, which included the Broadmoor Casino, and by December 12, 1895, the city had "four Mining Exchanges and 275 mining brokers." By 1898, the city was designated into quadrants by the north-south Cascade Avenue and the east-west Washington/Pikes Peak avenues.

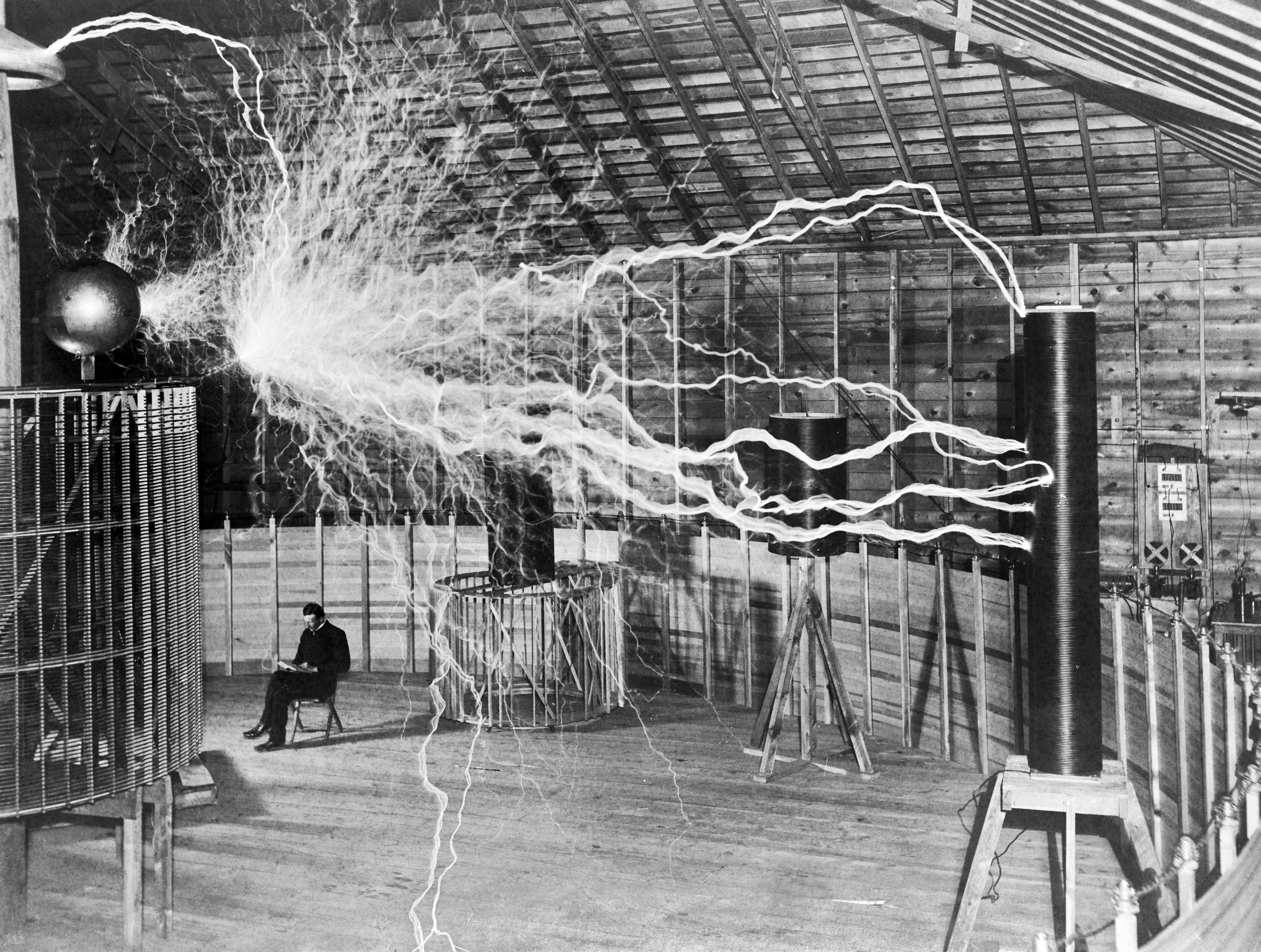
Nikola Tesla sitting in the Colorado Springs Experimental Station with his "magnifying transmitter" generating millions of volts

From 1899 to 1901 Tesla Experimental Station operated on Knob Hill, and aircraft flights to the Broadmoor's neighboring fields began in 1919. Alexander Airport north of the city opened in 1925, and in 1927 the original Colorado Springs Municipal Airport land was purchased east of the city.

The city's military presence began during World War II, beginning with Camp Carson (now the 135,000-acre Fort Carson base) that was established in 1941. During the war, the United States Army Air Forces leased land adjacent to the municipal airfield, naming it Peterson Field in December 1942.

In November 1950, Ent Air Force Base was selected as the Cold War headquarters for Air Defense Command (ADC). The former WWII Army Air Base, Peterson Field, which had been inactivated at the end of the war, was re-opened in 1951 as a U.S. Air Force base. North American Aerospace Defense Command (NORAD) was established as a hardened command and control center within the Cheyenne Mountain Complex during the Cold War.

Between 1965 and 1968, the University of Colorado Colorado Springs, Pikes Peak State College and Colorado Technical University were established in or near the city. In 1977 most of the former Ent AFB became a US Olympic training center. The Libertarian Party was founded within the city in the 1970s.

On October 1, 1981, the Broadmoor Addition, Cheyenne Canon, Ivywild, Skyway, and Stratton Meadows were annexed after the Colorado Supreme Court "overturned a district court decision that voided the annexation". Further annexations expanding the city include the Nielson Addition and Vineyard Commerce Park Annexation in September 2008.

On June 23, 2012, the Waldo Canyon fire began 4 miles (6.4 km) northwest of the city. The fire ended up destroying 347 homes and killing two people in Colorado Springs, causing the evacuation of 32,000 residents. At the time, the fire was the most destructive in state history, until it was surpassed by the Black Forest Fire the following year.

== Geography ==
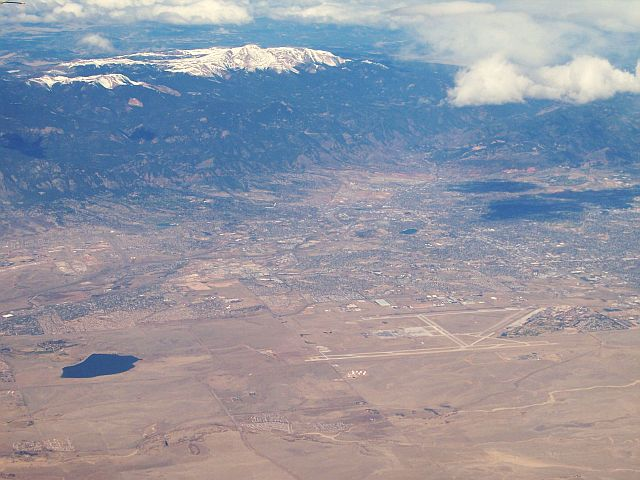
View of Colorado Springs and Pikes Peak from the eastern plains

The city lies in a semi-arid Steppe region, with the Southern Rocky Mountains to the west, the Palmer Divide to the north, high plains further east, and high desert lands to the south when leaving Fountain and approaching Pueblo. Colorado Springs is 69 miles (111 km) or at best one hour and five minutes south of Denver by car using I-25.

Colorado Springs has the greatest total area of any municipality in Colorado. During the 2020 United States census, the city had a total area of 195.761 square miles (507.019 km^{2}) including 0.362 square miles (0.937 km^{2}) of water.

=== Climate ===
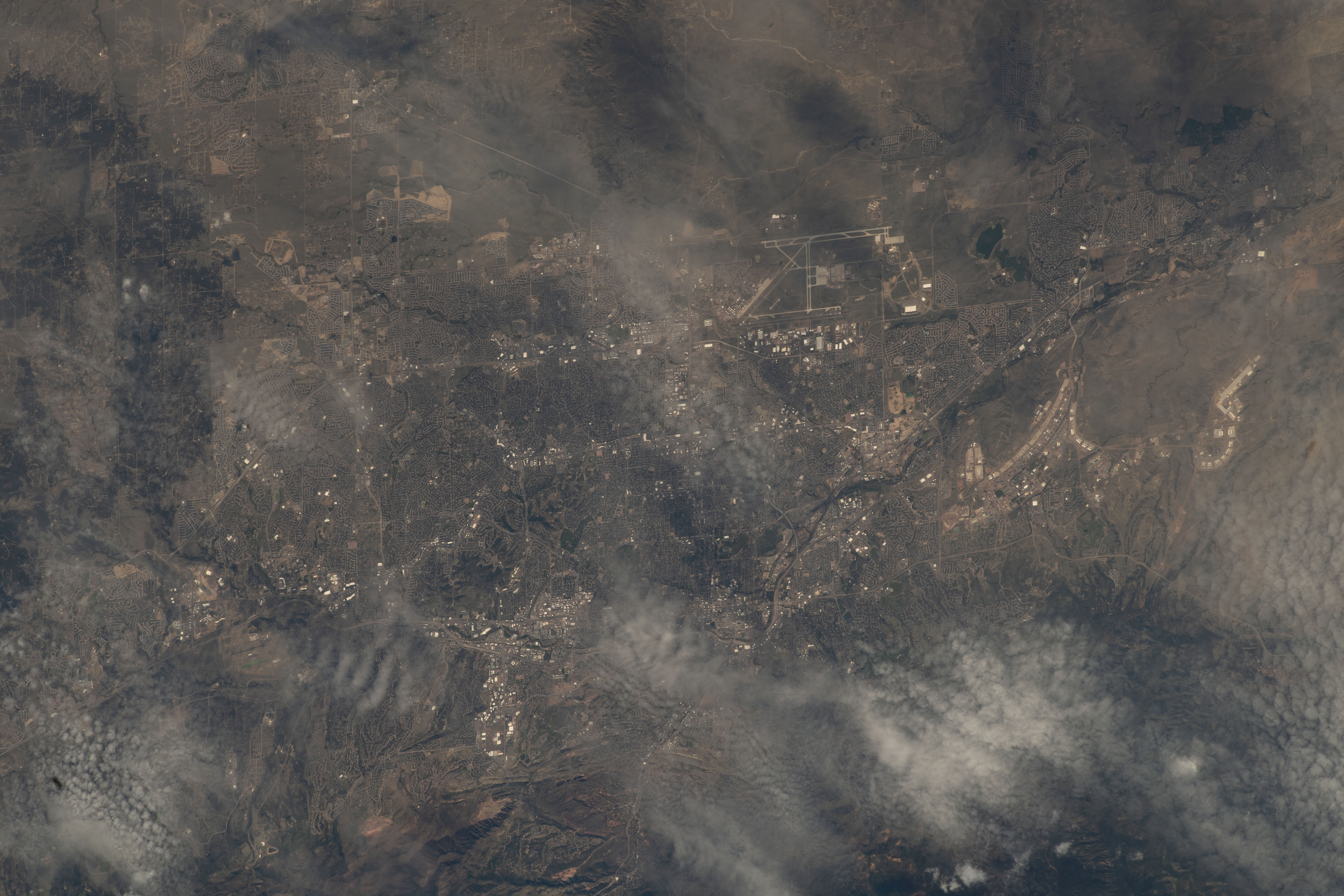
View of the city through the clouds on July 1, 2022, taken from the International Space Station with north oriented towards the left

Colorado Springs has a cooler, dry-winter monsoon influenced continental climate (Köppen Dwa/Cwa), and its location just east of the Rocky Mountains affords it the rapid warming influence from chinook winds during winter but also subjects it to drastic day-to-day variability in weather conditions. The city has abundant sunshine year-round, averaging 243 sunny days per year, and receives approximately 16.5 inches (419 mm) of annual precipitation. Due to unusually low precipitation for several years after flooding in 1999, Colorado Springs enacted lawn water restrictions in 2002. These were lifted in 2005 but permanently reinstated in December 2019.

Colorado Springs is one of the most active lightning strike areas in the United States. This natural phenomenon led Nikola Tesla to select Colorado Springs as the preferred location to build his lab and study electricity.

==== Seasonal climate ====
December is typically the coldest month, averaging 30.8 °F (−0.7 °C). Historically, January had been the coldest month, but, in recent years, December has had both lower daily maxima and minima. Typically, there are 5.2 nights with sub-0 °F (−18 °C) lows and 23.6 days where the high does not rise above freezing.

Snowfall is usually moderate and remains on the ground briefly because of direct sun, with the city receiving 38 inches (97 cm) per season, although the mountains to the west often receive in excess of triple that amount; March is the snowiest month in the region, both by total accumulation and number of days with measurable snowfall. In addition, 8 of the top 10 heaviest 24-hour snowfalls have occurred from March to May. Summers are warm, with July, the warmest month, averaging 70.9 °F (21.6 °C), and 18 days of 90 °F (32 °C)+ highs annually. Due to the high elevation and aridity, nights are usually relatively cool and rarely does the low remain above 70 °F (21 °C). Dry weather generally prevails, but brief afternoon thunderstorms are common, especially in July and August when the city receives the majority of its annual rainfall, due to the North American monsoon.

The first autumn freeze and the last freeze in the spring, on average, occur on October 2 and May 6, respectively; the average window for measurable snowfall (≥0.1 in or 0.25 cm) is October 21 through April 25. Extreme temperatures range from 101 °F (38 °C) on June 26, 2012, and most recently on June 21, 2016, down to −27 °F (−33 °C) on February 1, 1951, and December 9, 1919.

==== Climate data ====
Climate data for Colorado Springs, Colorado (Colorado Springs Municipal Airport), 1991–2020 normals, (Note: Mean monthly maxima and minima (i.e. the expected highest and lowest temperature readings at any point during the year or given month) calculated based on data at said location from 1991 to 2020.) extremes 1894–present
| Month | Jan | Feb | Mar | Apr | May | Jun | Jul | Aug | Sep | Oct | Nov | Dec | Year |
|---|---|---|---|---|---|---|---|---|---|---|---|---|---|
| Record high °F (°C) | 73 (23) | 77 (25) | 86 (30) | 87 (31) | 94 (34) | 101 (38) | 100 (38) | 99 (37) | 98 (37) | 87 (31) | 78 (26) | 77 (25) | 101 (38) |
| Mean maximum °F (°C) | 64.5 (18.1) | 66.2 (19.0) | 72.8 (22.7) | 79.0 (26.1) | 85.8 (29.9) | 93.8 (34.3) | 95.2 (35.1) | 92.7 (33.7) | 88.9 (31.6) | 81.8 (27.7) | 71.6 (22.0) | 64.1 (17.8) | 96.7 (35.9) |
| Mean daily maximum °F (°C) | 45.0 (7.2) | 46.5 (8.1) | 54.9 (12.7) | 61.0 (16.1) | 70.7 (21.5) | 81.6 (27.6) | 86.5 (30.3) | 83.6 (28.7) | 77.1 (25.1) | 64.7 (18.2) | 52.9 (11.6) | 44.6 (7.0) | 64.1 (17.8) |
| Daily mean °F (°C) | 31.8 (−0.1) | 33.4 (0.8) | 41.1 (5.1) | 47.5 (8.6) | 57.5 (14.2) | 67.2 (19.6) | 72.4 (22.4) | 70.1 (21.2) | 63.0 (17.2) | 50.7 (10.4) | 39.5 (4.2) | 31.7 (−0.2) | 50.5 (10.3) |
| Mean daily minimum °F (°C) | 18.5 (−7.5) | 20.2 (−6.6) | 27.3 (−2.6) | 34.0 (1.1) | 43.5 (6.4) | 52.8 (11.6) | 58.2 (14.6) | 56.6 (13.7) | 48.9 (9.4) | 36.6 (2.6) | 26.0 (−3.3) | 18.7 (−7.4) | 36.8 (2.7) |
| Mean minimum °F (°C) | −1.4 (−18.6) | 1.4 (−17.0) | 9.6 (−12.4) | 19.3 (−7.1) | 30.1 (−1.1) | 42.5 (5.8) | 50.9 (10.5) | 48.5 (9.2) | 35.6 (2.0) | 19.6 (−6.9) | 7.4 (−13.7) | −1.6 (−18.7) | −7.1 (−21.7) |
| Record low °F (°C) | −26 (−32) | −27 (−33) | −16 (−27) | −3 (−19) | 15 (−9) | 27 (−3) | 37 (3) | 34 (1) | 20 (−7) | −6 (−21) | −12 (−24) | −27 (−33) | −27 (−33) |
| Average precipitation inches (mm) | 0.29 (7.4) | 0.32 (8.1) | 0.79 (20) | 1.45 (37) | 1.99 (51) | 2.27 (58) | 3.12 (79) | 2.96 (75) | 1.35 (34) | 0.77 (20) | 0.37 (9.4) | 0.23 (5.8) | 15.91 (404) |
| Average snowfall inches (cm) | 4.9 (12) | 4.6 (12) | 5.7 (14) | 5.5 (14) | 0.6 (1.5) | 0.0 (0.0) | 0.0 (0.0) | 0.0 (0.0) | 0.2 (0.51) | 2.5 (6.4) | 4.4 (11) | 4.1 (10) | 32.5 (83) |
| Average extreme snow depth inches (cm) | 2 (5.1) | 3 (7.6) | 3 (7.6) | 3 (7.6) | 1 (2.5) | 0 (0) | 0 (0) | 0 (0) | 0 (0) | 2 (5.1) | 2 (5.1) | 2 (5.1) | 3 (7.6) |
| Average precipitation days (≥ 0.01 in) | 3.6 | 4.6 | 6.7 | 8.2 | 10.3 | 9.8 | 12.1 | 12.4 | 6.6 | 4.8 | 4.5 | 3.7 | 87.3 |
| Average snowy days (≥ 0.1 in) | 3.9 | 4.4 | 4.9 | 3.6 | 0.6 | 0.0 | 0.0 | 0.0 | 0.3 | 1.7 | 3.7 | 4.0 | 27.1 |
| Mean monthly sunshine hours | 217 | 224 | 279 | 300 | 310 | 330 | 341 | 310 | 270 | 248 | 210 | 217 | 3,256 |
Source 1: NOAA
Source 2: Weather-US

== Demographics ==
Historical population
| Census | Pop. | Note | %± |
|---|---|---|---|
| 1880 | 4,226 | | — |
| 1890 | 11,140 | | 163.6% |
| 1900 | 21,085 | | 89.3% |
| 1910 | 29,078 | | 37.9% |
| 1920 | 30,105 | | 3.5% |
| 1930 | 33,237 | | 10.4% |
| 1940 | 36,789 | | 10.7% |
| 1950 | 45,472 | | 23.6% |
| 1960 | 70,194 | | 54.4% |
| 1970 | 135,517 | | 93.1% |
| 1980 | 215,105 | | 58.7% |
| 1990 | 281,140 | | 30.7% |
| 2000 | 360,890 | | 28.4% |
| 2010 | 416,427 | | 15.4% |
| 2020 | 478,961 | | 15.0% |
| 2025 (est.) | 494,743 | ▲ | 3.3% |
U.S. Decennial Census

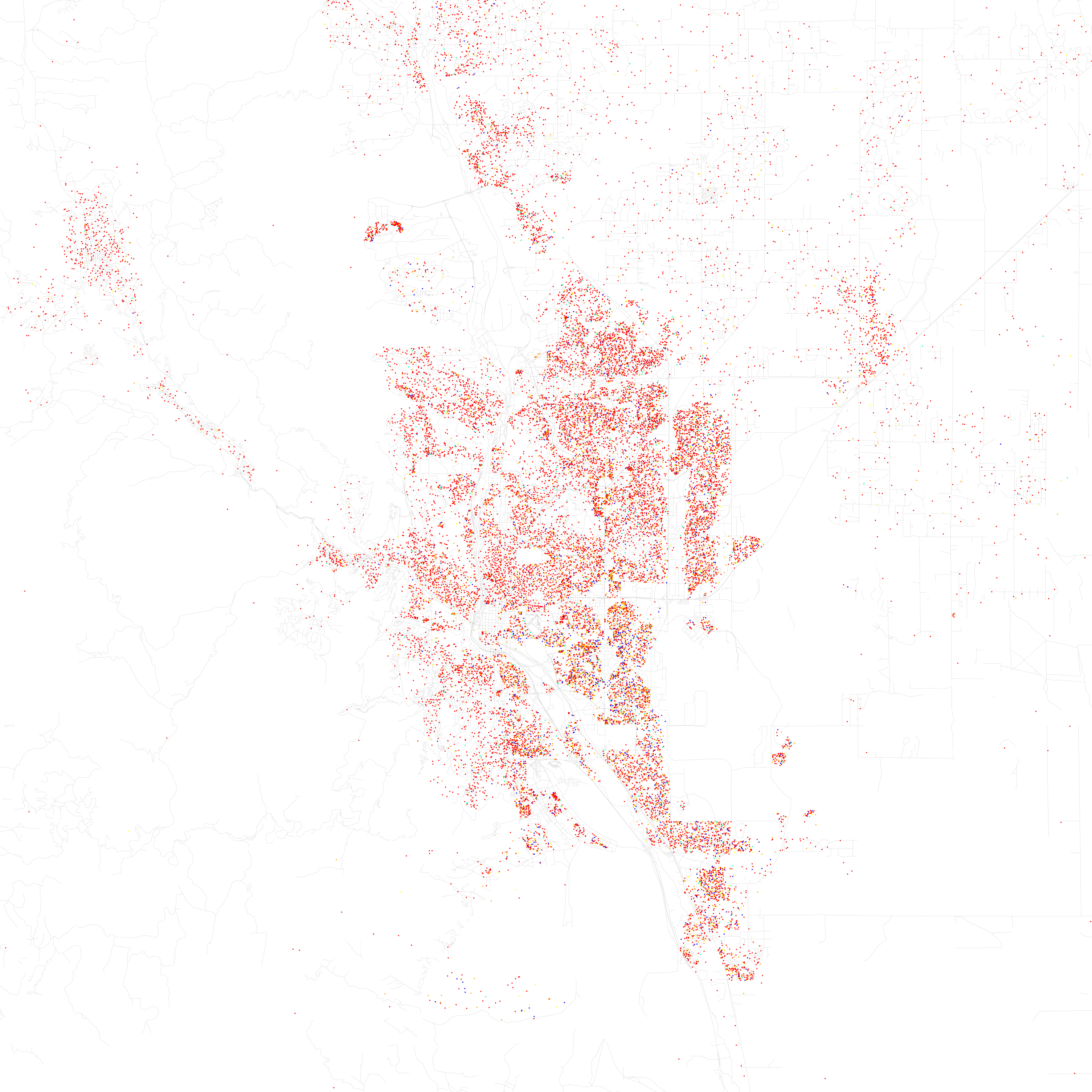
Map of racial distribution in Colorado Springs, 2010 U.S. Census. Each dot is 25 people: ⬤ White ⬤ Black ⬤ Asian ⬤ Hispanic ⬤ Other

Colorado Springs, Colorado – Racial and ethnic composition Note: the US Census treats Hispanic/Latino as an ethnic category. This table excludes Latinos from the racial categories and assigns them to a separate category. Hispanics/Latinos may be of any race.
| Race / Ethnicity (NH = Non-Hispanic) | Pop 2000 | Pop 2010 | Pop 2020 | % 2000 | % 2010 | % 2020 |
|---|---|---|---|---|---|---|
| White alone (NH) | 271,734 | 294,598 | 312,752 | 75.30% | 70.74% | 65.30% |
| Black or African American alone (NH) | 22,760 | 24,391 | 26,368 | 6.31% | 5.86% | 5.51% |
| Native American or Alaska Native alone (NH) | 2,095 | 2,403 | 2,504 | 0.58% | 0.58% | 0.52% |
| Asian alone (NH) | 9,956 | 12,206 | 15,672 | 2.76% | 2.93% | 3.27% |
| Pacific Islander alone (NH) | 681 | 1,092 | 1,392 | 0.19% | 0.26% | 0.29% |
| Other race alone (NH) | 651 | 768 | 2,831 | 0.18% | 0.18% | 0.59% |
| Mixed race or Multiracial (NH) | 9,683 | 14,103 | 29,545 | 2.68% | 3.39% | 6.17% |
| Hispanic or Latino (any race) | 43,330 | 66,866 | 87,897 | 12.01% | 16.06% | 18.35% |
| Total | 360,890 | 416,427 | 478,961 | 100.00% | 100.00% | 100.00% |

=== 2020 census ===
As of the 2020 United States census, the population of the city of Colorado Springs was 478,961 (40th most populous U.S. city), the population of the Colorado Springs Metropolitan Statistical Area was 755,105 (79th most populous MSA), and the population of the Front Range Urban Corridor was 5,055,344.

=== 2010 census ===
As of the 2010 United States census, 78.8% of the population of the city was White (non-Hispanic Whites were 70.7% of the population, compared with 86.6% in 1970), 16.1% Hispanic or Latino of any race (compared with 7.4% in 1970), 6.3% Black or African American, 3.0% Asian, 1.0% descended from indigenous peoples of the Americas, 0.3% descended from indigenous Hawaiians and other Pacific islanders, 5.5% of some other race, and 5.1% of two or more races. Mexican Americans made up 14.6% of the city's population, compared with 9.1% in 1990. The median age in the city was 35 years. (Note: As of the census of 2000 (limited only to the city limits and not including the very diverse Fort Carson area which many view as being a part of the Colorado Springs metropolitan area), there were 360,890 people, 141,516 households, and 93,117 families residing in the city. The population density was 1,942.9 inhabitants per square mile (750.2/km^{2}). There were 148,690 housing units at an average density of 800.5 units per square mile (309.1 units/km^{2}). The racial makeup of the city was 80.7% White, 6.6% African American, 0.9% Native American, 2.8% Asian, 0.2% Pacific Islander, 5.0% from other races, and 3.9% from two or more races. 12.0% of the population were Hispanic or Latino of any race. There were 141,516 households, out of which 34.0% had children under the age of 18 living with them, 51.5% were married couples living together, 10.6% had a female householder with no husband present, and 34.2% were non-families. 27.0% of all households were made up of individuals, and 6.9% had someone living alone who was 65 years of age or older. The average household size was 2.50 and the average family size was 3.06. In the city, the population was spread out, with 26.5% under the age of 18, 10.3% from 18 to 24, 32.8% from 25 to 44, 20.8% from 45 to 64, and 9.6% who were 65 years of age or older. The median age was 34 years. For every 100 females, there were 97.8 males. For every 100 females age 18 and over, there were 95.2 males. (Note: City statistics do not include the demographic influence of five local military bases). The median income for a household in the city was $45,081, and the median income for a family was $53,478. Males had a median income of $36,786 versus $26,427 for females. The per capita income for the city was $22,496. About 6.1% of families and 8.7% of the population were below the poverty line, including 10.8% of those under age 18 and 7.2% of those age 65 or over.)

== Economy ==
Colorado Springs's economy is driven primarily by the military, the high-tech industry, and tourism, in that order. The city is experiencing slight growth in the service sectors. As of April 2025, the unemployment rate in Colorado Springs was 4.6%. The state's unemployment rate was 4.8% compared to 4.2% for the nation.

=== Military ===
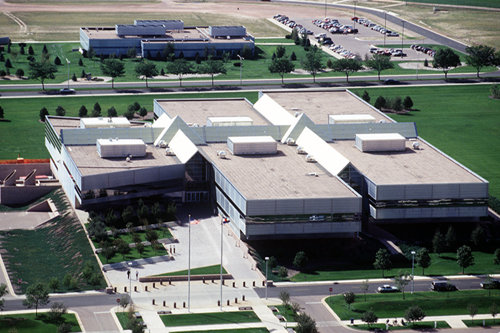
United States Space Force – Peterson Space Force Base Building 1

As of 2021, there are nearly 45,000 active-duty troops in the Colorado Springs area. There are more than 100,000 veterans and thousands of reservists. The military and defense contractors supply more than 40% of the Pikes Peak region's economy.

Colorado Springs is home to the Peterson Space Force Base, Schriever Space Force Base, Cheyenne Mountain Space Force Station, U.S. Space Command, and Space Operations Command—the largest contingent of space service military installations, responsible for intelligence gathering, space operations, and cyber missions.

Peterson Space Force Base is responsible for the North American Aerospace Defense Command (NORAD) and the United States Northern Command (USNORTHCOM) headquarters, Space Operations Command, and Space Deltas 2, 3, and 7. Located at Peterson is the 302nd Airlift Wing, an Air Force Reserve unit, that transports passengers and cargo and fights wildfires.

Schriever Space Force Base is responsible for Joint Task Force-Space Defense and Space Deltas 6, 8, and 9. The NORAD and USNORTHCOM Alternate Command Center is located at the Cheyenne Mountain Complex. Within the mountain complex, the Cheyenne Mountain Space Force Station has been operated by Space Operations Command. On January 13, 2021, the Air Force announced a new permanent home for Space Command, moving it from Colorado Springs to Huntsville, Alabama in 2026, but the decision could be reversed by Congress. (Note: Political leaders in Colorado plan to ask President Biden's administration to review the merits of the decision. Huntsville also has to pass an environmental review before the decision is final. Air Force documents show Alabama ranked higher than Colorado in 11 of 21 comparisons used by the government in seeking the best site for the new U.S. Space Command's permanent headquarters. In the Space Command headquarters comparison, Alabama ranks in top third in nine of the 21 categories. Colorado ranks in the top third in five categories. Alabama ranks in bottom third in three of the 21 categories and Colorado ranks in bottom third in 10 of the 21 categories.)

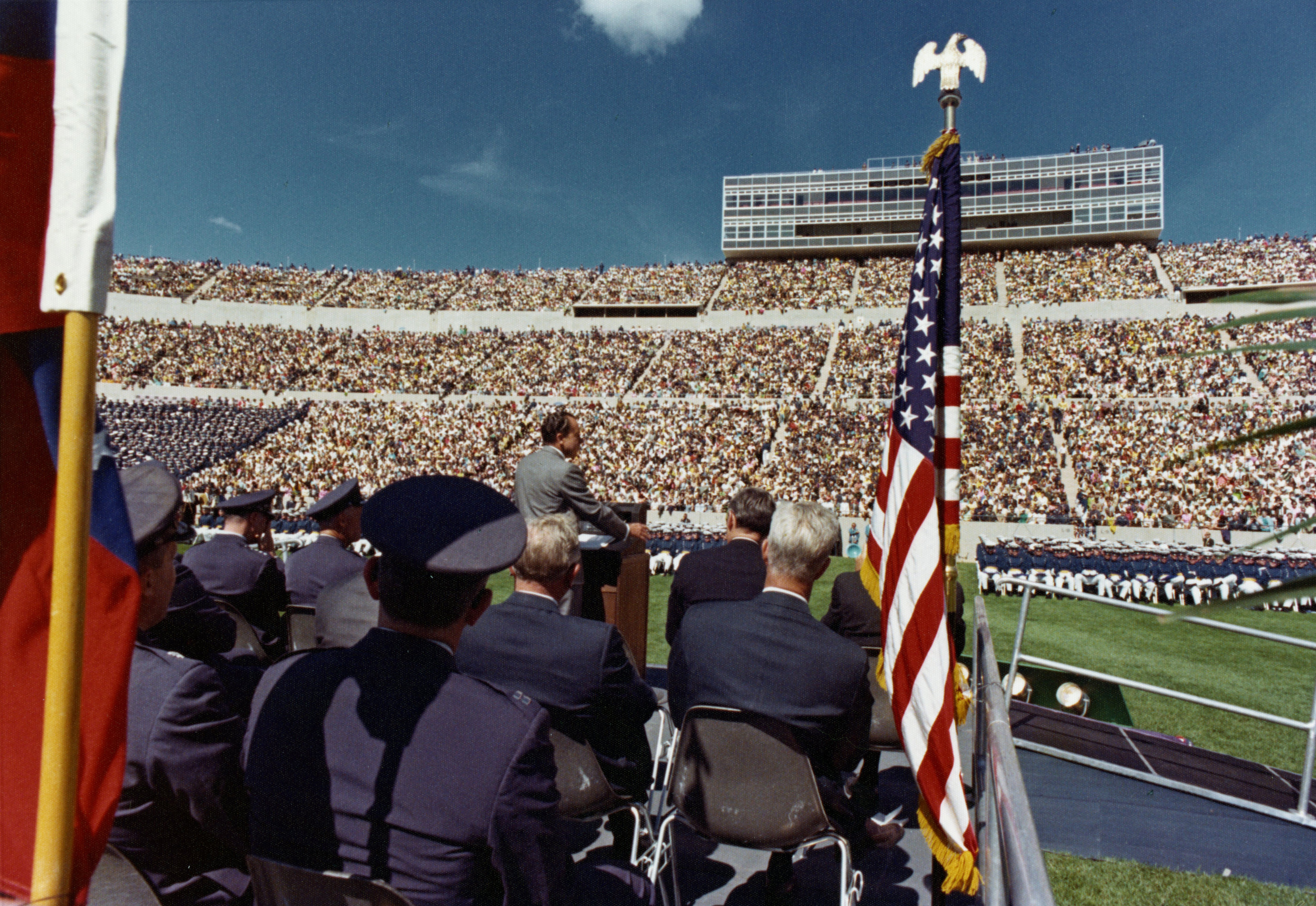
President Richard Nixon gives a commencement ceremony speech at the Air Force Academy in Colorado Springs, June 4, 1969.

Army divisions are trained and stationed at Fort Carson. The United States Air Force Academy was established after World War II on land donated by the City of Colorado Springs.

=== Defense industry ===
The defense industry forms a significant part of the Colorado Springs economy, with some of the city's largest employers being defense contractors. Some defense corporations have left or downsized city campuses, but slight growth has been recorded. Significant defense corporations in the city include Northrop Grumman, Boeing, General Dynamics, L3Harris Technologies, SAIC, ITT, Lockheed Martin, and Bluestaq. The Space Foundation is based in Colorado Springs.

=== High-tech industry ===
A large percentage of Colorado Springs's economy is still based on manufacturing high-tech and complex electronic equipment. The high-tech sector in the Colorado Springs area has decreased its overall presence from 2000 to 2006 (from around 21,000 to around 8,000), with notable reductions in information technology and complex electronic equipment. Current trends project the high-tech employment ratio will continue to decrease.

High-tech corporations offering fibre-optics to the premises connections within the city include: Lumen Technologies, Comcast and other providers as of 2023. Hewlett-Packard still has some sales, support, and SAN storage engineering center for the computer industry. Storage Networking Industry Association is the home of the SNIA Technology Center. Keysight Technologies, spun off in 2014 from Agilent, which was itself spun off from HP in 1999 as an independent, publicly traded company, has its oscilloscope research and development division based in Colorado Springs. Intel had 250 employees in 2009 but has ceased operations. The Intel facility is now used for the centralized unemployment offices, social services, El Paso county offices, and a bitcoin mining facility. Microchip Technology (formerly Atmel), is a chip fabrication organization. The Apple Inc. facility was sold to Sanmina-SCI in 1996.

== Arts and culture ==
=== Tourism ===
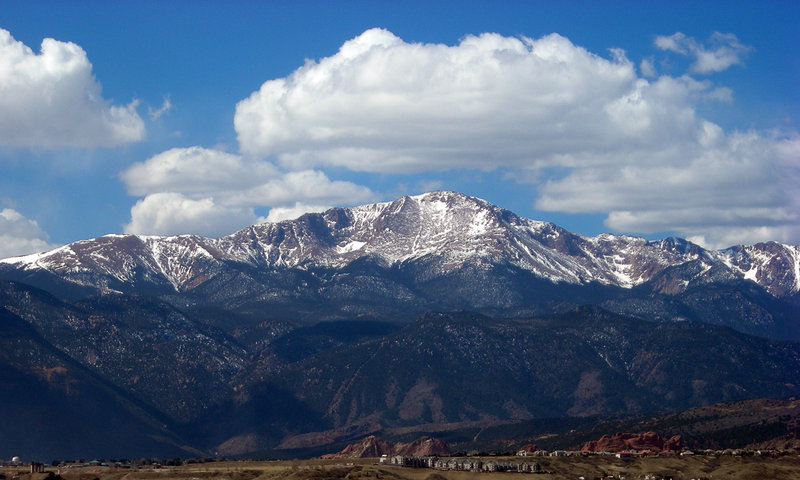
Pikes Peak, the easternmost "fourteener" in the United States

Almost immediately following the arrival of railroads beginning in 1871, the city's location at the base of Pikes Peak and the Rocky Mountains made it a popular tourism destination. Tourism is the third largest employer in the Pikes Peak region, accounting for more than 16,000 jobs. In 2018, 23 million day and overnight visitors came to the area, contributing $2.4 billion in revenue.

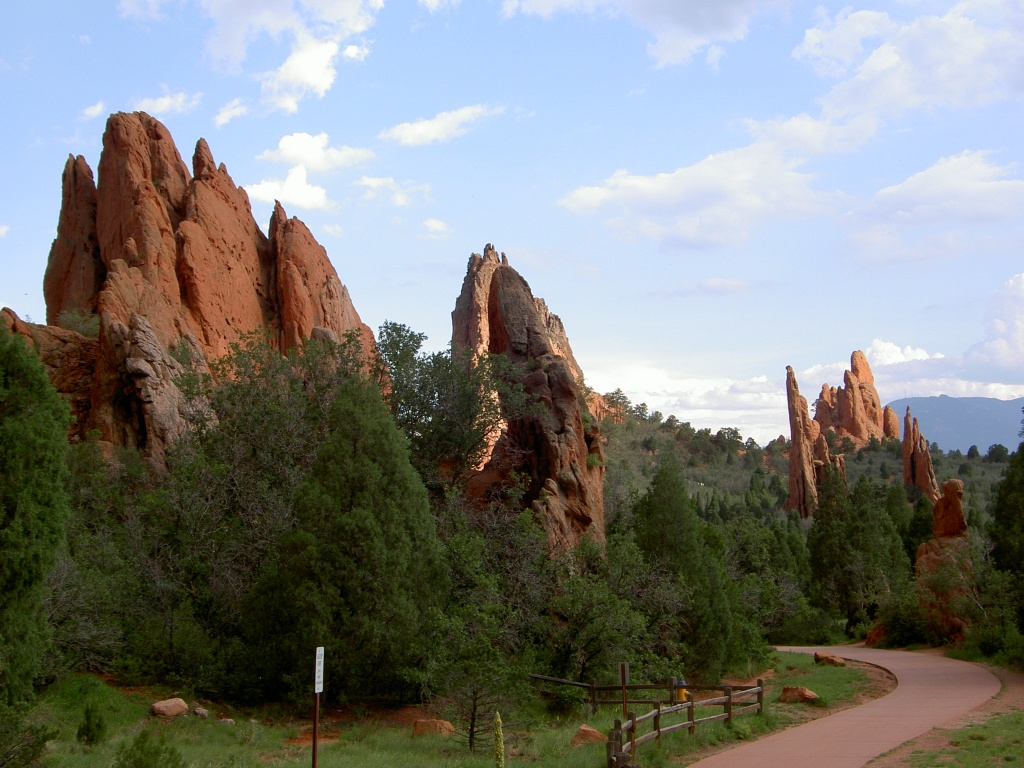
Garden of the Gods

Colorado Springs has more than 55 attractions and activities in the area, including Garden of the Gods park, United States Air Force Academy, the ANA Money Museum, Cheyenne Mountain Zoo, Colorado Springs Fine Arts Center at Colorado College, Old Colorado City, The National Museum of World War II Aviation, and the U.S. Olympic & Paralympic Training Center. In 2020, the United States Olympic & Paralympic Museum opened; the Flying W Ranch Chuckwagon Dinner & Western Show reopened in 2020. A new Pikes Peak Summit Complex opened at the 14,115-foot (4,302 m) summit in 2021. The Manitou and Pikes Peak Railway also reopened in 2021.

The downtown Colorado Springs Visitor Information Center offers free area information to leisure and business travelers. The Cultural Office of the Pikes Peak Region (COPPeR), also downtown, supports and advocates for the arts throughout the Pikes Peak Region. It operates the PeakRadar website to communicate city events.

=== Annual cultural events ===
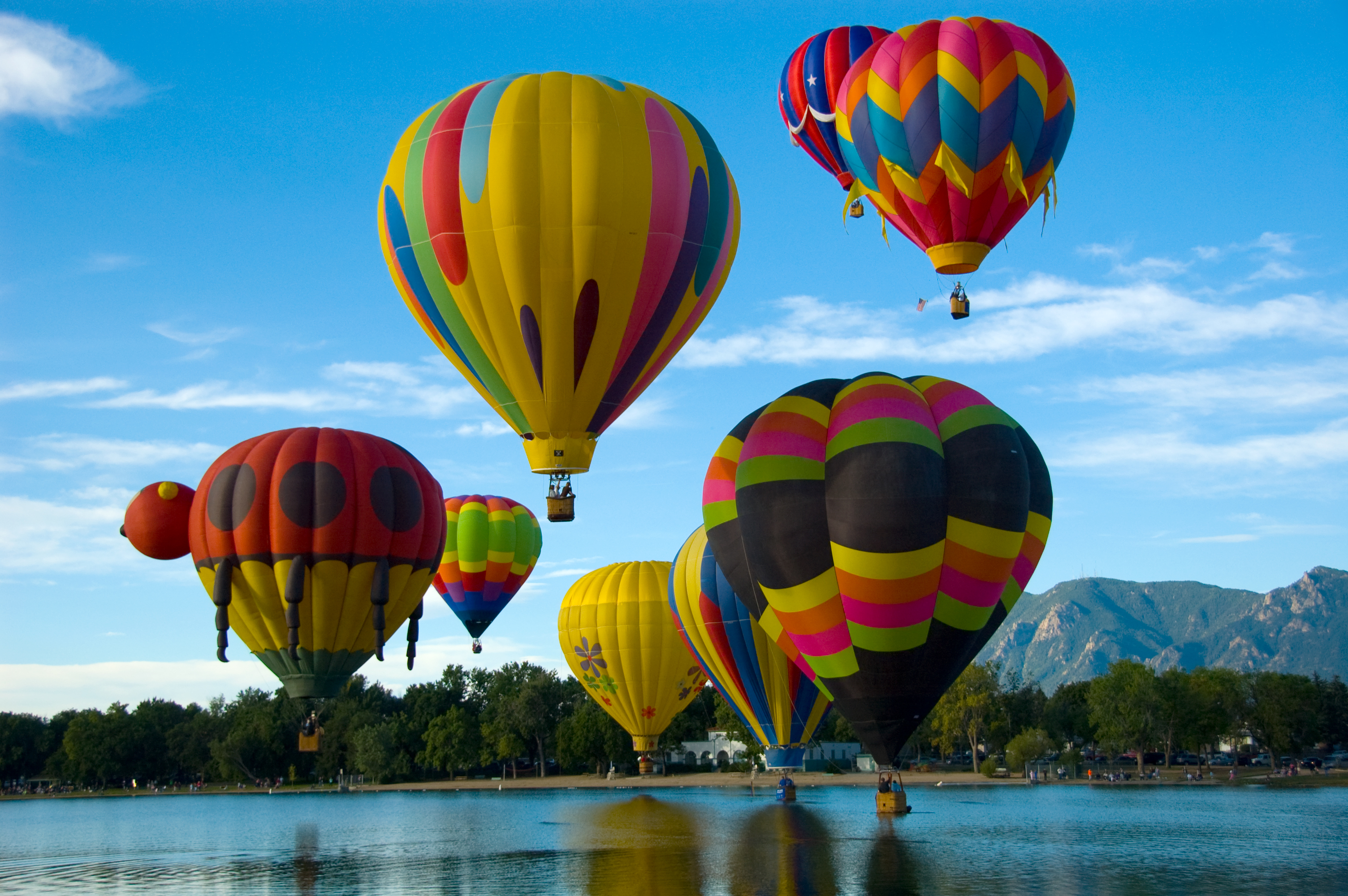
The Saturday morning launch, overlooking Prospect Lake, in downtown Colorado Springs

Colorado Springs is home to the annual Colorado Springs Labor Day Lift Off, a hot air balloon festival that takes place over Labor Day weekend at the city's Memorial Park.

Other annual events include: a comic book convention and science fiction convention called GalaxyFest in February, a pride parade called PrideFest in July, the Greek Festival, the Pikes Peak Ascent and Marathon, and the Steers & Beers Whiskey and Beer Festival in August, and the Emma Crawford Coffin Races and Festival in nearby Manitou Springs and Arts Month in October.

The Colorado Springs Festival of Lights Parade is held the first Saturday in December. The parade is held on Tejon Street in Downtown Colorado Springs.

=== Breweries ===
In 2017, Colorado had the third-most craft breweries at 348 in the United States. Breweries and microbreweries have become popular in Colorado Springs, which hosts over 30 of them.

=== Religious institutions ===
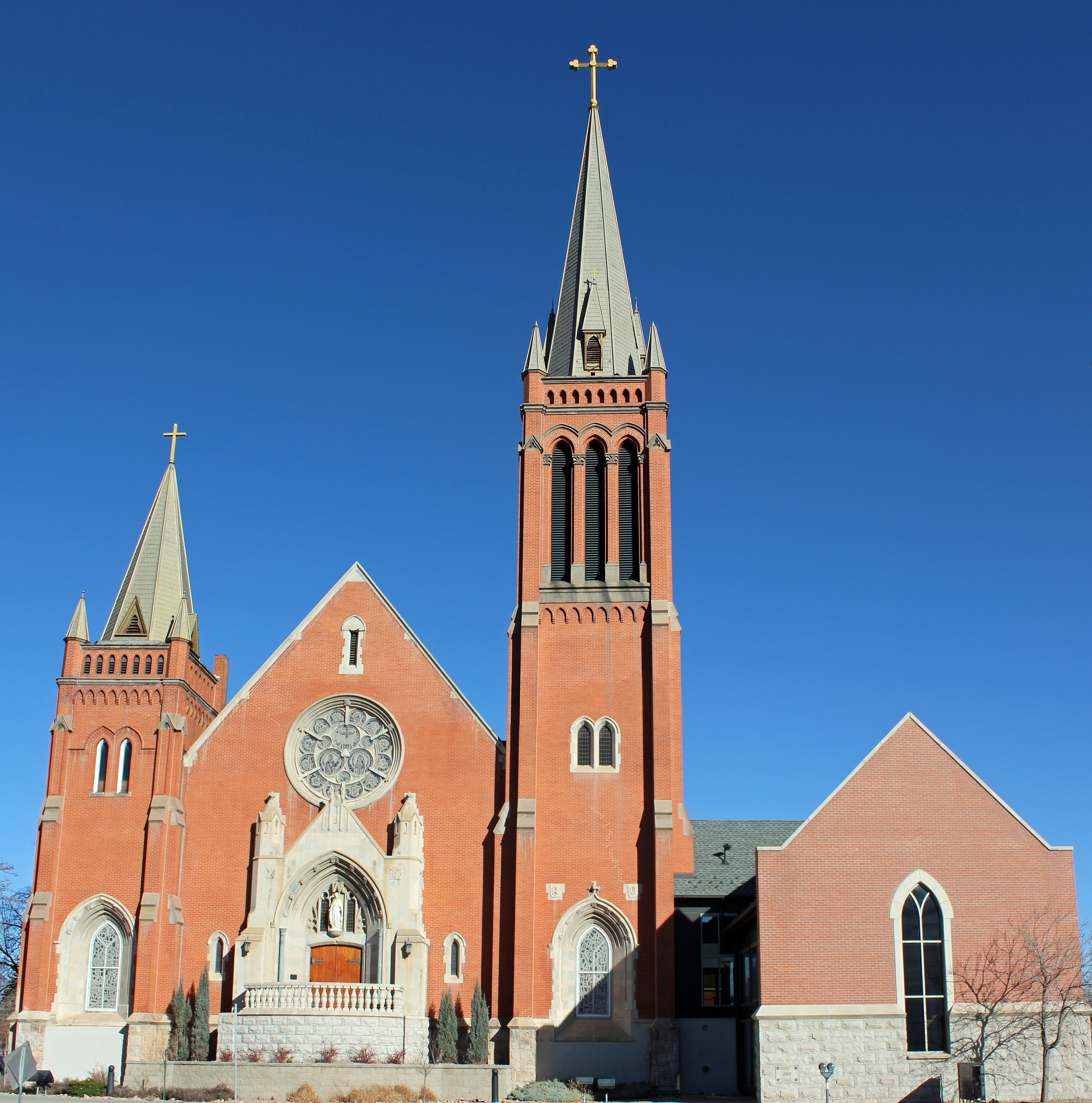
St. Mary's Cathedral is the seat of the Roman Catholic Diocese of Colorado Springs.

Although houses of worship of almost every major world religion can be found in Colorado Springs, the city has in particular attracted a large influx of Evangelical Christians and Christian organizations in recent years. At one time Colorado Springs was the national headquarters for 81 different religious organizations, earning the city the tongue-in-cheek nicknames "the Evangelical Vatican" and "The Christian Mecca".

Religious groups with regional or international headquarters in Colorado Springs include:

- Association of Christian Schools International
- Biblica
- Children's HopeChest
- Community Bible Study
- Compassion International
- David C. Cook/Integrity Music
- Development Associates International
- Engineering Ministries International
- Family Talk
- Focus on the Family
- Global Action
- HCJB
- Hope & Home
- The Navigators
- One Child Matters
- Roman Catholic Diocese of Colorado Springs
- VisionTrust
- WayFM Network
- Young Life

=== Marijuana ===
Although Colorado voters approved Colorado Amendment 64, a constitutional amendment in 2012 legalizing retail sales of marijuana for recreational purposes, the Colorado Springs city council voted not to permit retail shops in the city, as was allowed in the amendment. Medical marijuana outlets continued to operate in Colorado Springs. In 2015, there were 91 medical marijuana clinics in the city, which reported sales of $59.6 million in 2014, up 11 percent from the previous year, but without recreational marijuana shops. On April 26, 2016, Colorado Springs city council decided to extend the current six-month moratorium to eighteen months with no new licenses to be granted until May 2017. A scholarly paper suggested the city would give up $25.4 million in tax revenue and fees if the city continued to thwart the industry from opening within the city limits. As of March 1, 2018, there were 131 medical marijuana centers and no recreational cannabis stores. In November 2024 a referendum vote allowed existing medical marijuana dispensaries to obtain recreational marijuana sales licenses, and recreational sales began in April 2025.

=== In popular culture ===
Colorado Springs has been the subject of or setting for many books, films and television shows, and is a frequent backdrop for political thrillers and military-themed stories because of its many military installations and vital importance to the United States' continental defense. Notable television series using the city as a setting include Dr. Quinn, Medicine Woman, Homicide Hunter and the Stargate series Stargate SG-1, as well as the films WarGames, The Prestige, and BlacKkKlansman.

In a North Korean propaganda video released in April 2013, Colorado Springs was singled out as one of four targets for a missile strike. The video failed to pinpoint Colorado Springs on the map, instead showing a spot somewhere in Louisiana.

== Sports ==
=== Olympic sports ===
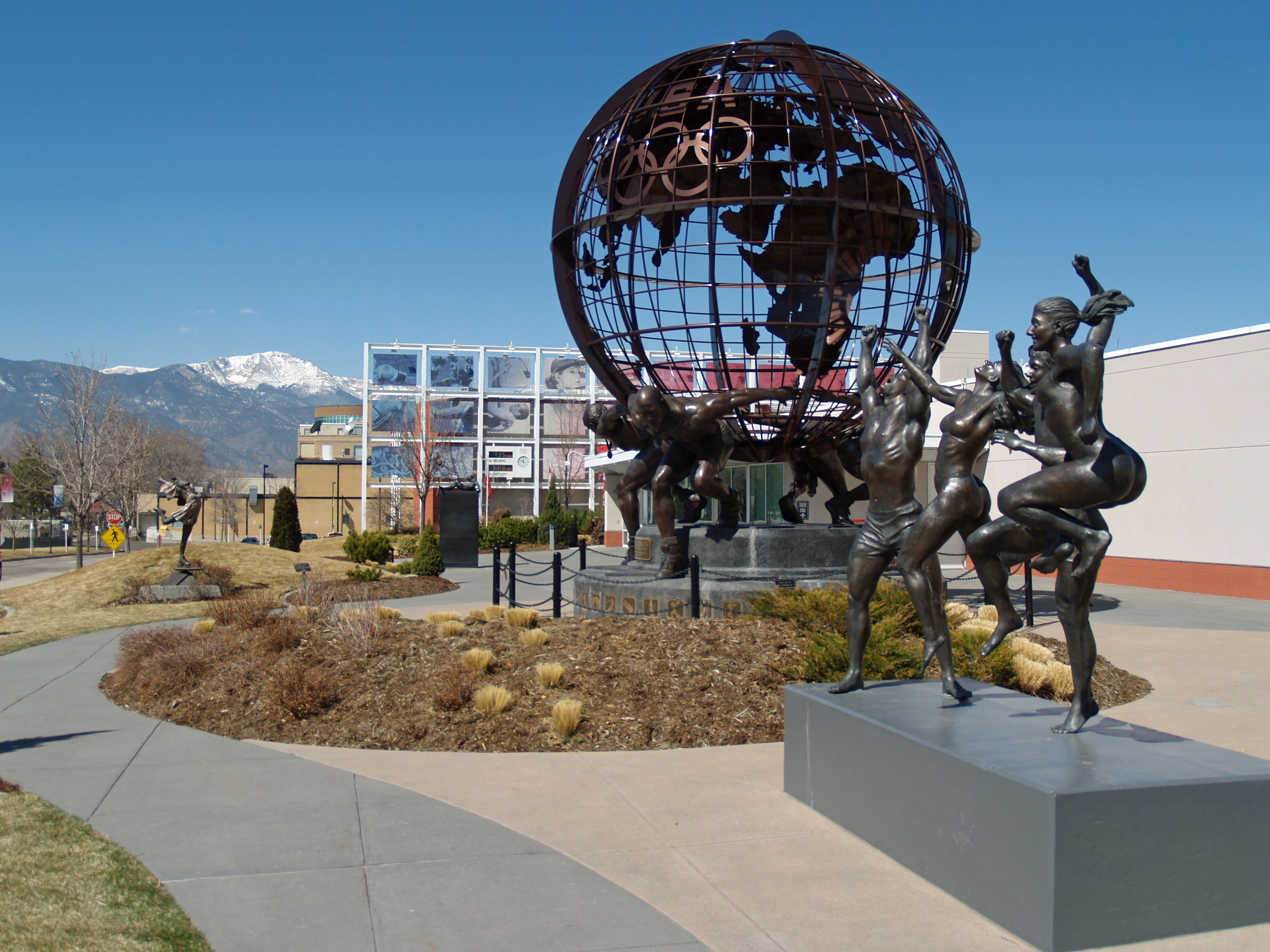
United States Olympic Committee headquarters and training facility

Colorado Springs, dubbed Olympic City USA, is home to the United States Olympic & Paralympic Training Center and the headquarters of the United States Olympic & Paralympic Committee and the United States Anti-Doping Agency.

Further, over 50 national sports organizations (non-Olympic) headquarter in Colorado Springs. These include the National Strength and Conditioning Association, Sports Incubator, a various non-Olympic Sports (such as USA Ultimate), and more.

Colorado Springs and Denver hosted the 1962 World Ice Hockey Championships.

The city has a long association with the sport of figure skating, having hosted the U.S. Figure Skating Championships six times and the World Figure Skating Championships five times. It is home to the World Figure Skating Museum and Hall of Fame and the Broadmoor Skating Club, a notable training center for the sport. In recent years, the Broadmoor World Arena has hosted skating events such as Skate America and the Four Continents Figure Skating Championships.

=== Baseball ===
Colorado Springs was home to the Western League's Colorado Springs Sky Sox from 1950-1858, the Pacific Coast League's Colorado Springs Sky Sox from 1988 to 2018, and the Pioneer League's Rocky Mountain Vibes from 2019 to 2025.

=== Football ===
Beginning in 2027, Colorado Springs will be the home of the Colorado UFL team.

=== Paragliding ===
The United States Hang Gliding and Paragliding Association (USHPA) is based out of Colorado Springs.

=== Pikes Peak International Hill Climb ===
The Pikes Peak International Hill Climb (PPIHC), also known as The Race to the Clouds, is an annual invitational automobile and motorcycle hill climb to the summit of Pikes Peak, every year on the last Sunday of June. The highway was not completely paved until 2011.

=== Local professional teams ===
| Name | Sport | Founded | League | Venue | Ref. |
|---|---|---|---|---|---|
| Colorado Springs Switchbacks FC | Soccer | 2015 | USL Championship | Weidner Field | |
| Colorado Stampede | American football | 2027 | United Football League | Weidner Field | |

=== Local collegiate teams ===
The local colleges feature many sports teams. Notable among them are several nationally competitive NCAA Division I teams: United States Air Force Academy (Falcons) Football, Basketball and Hockey and Colorado College (Tigers) Men’s Hockey, and Women's Soccer.

=== Rodeo ===
Colorado Springs was the original headquarters of the Professional Bull Riders (PBR) from its founding in 1992 until 2005, when the organization was moved to Pueblo.

== Parks and recreation ==
The city's Parks, Recreation and Cultural Services manage 136 neighborhood parks, eight community parks, seven regional parks, and five sports complexes, totaling 9,000 acres (3,600 ha). They also manage 500 acres (200 ha) of trails, of which 160 miles (260 km) are park trails and 105 miles (169 km) are urban. There are 5,000 acres (2,000 ha) of open space in 48 open-space areas.

=== Parks ===
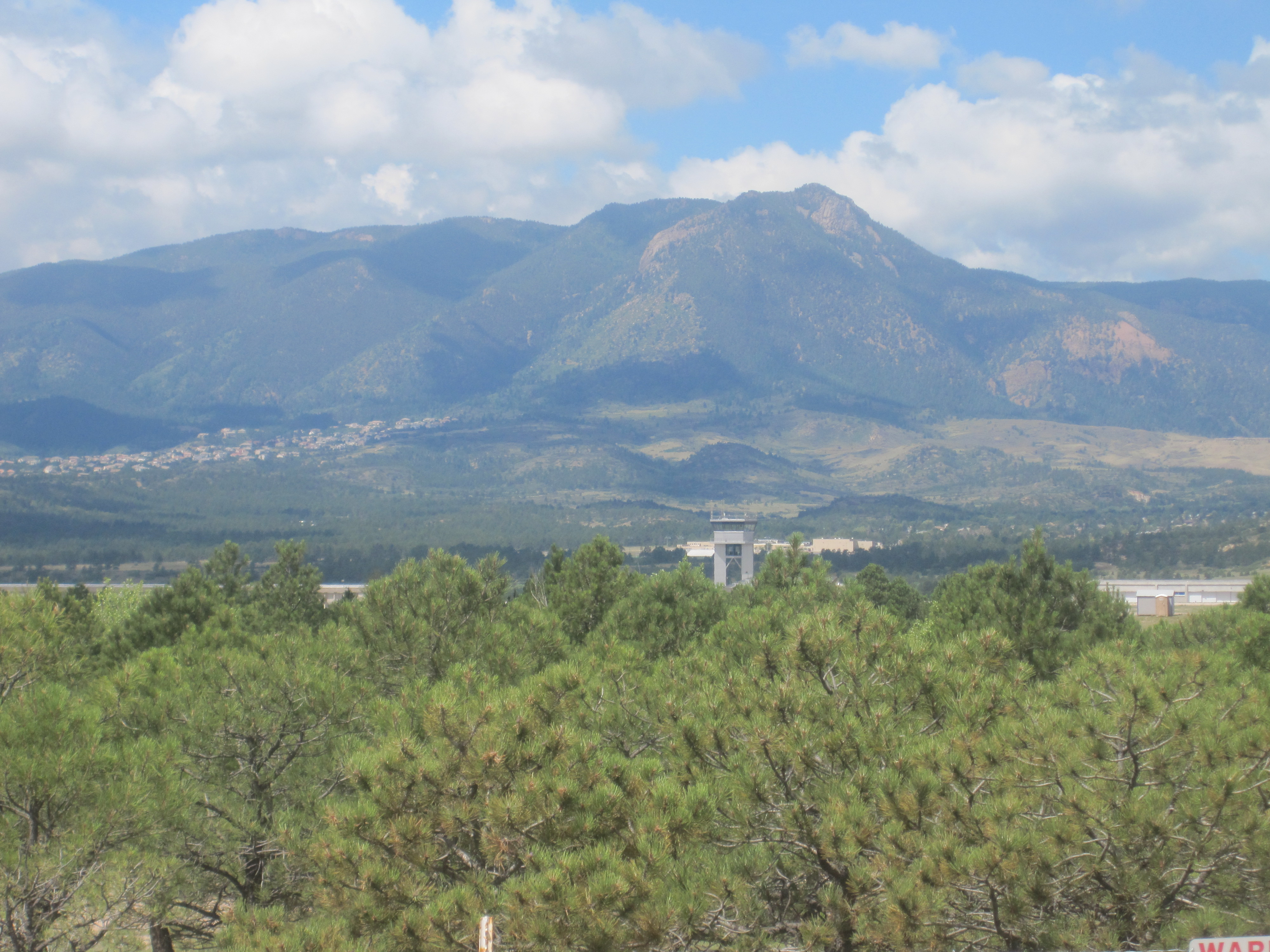
Ackerman Overlook, near United States Air Force Academy off Interstate 25 in Colorado Springs, is named for Jasper D. Ackerman (1896–1988), a banker and rancher.

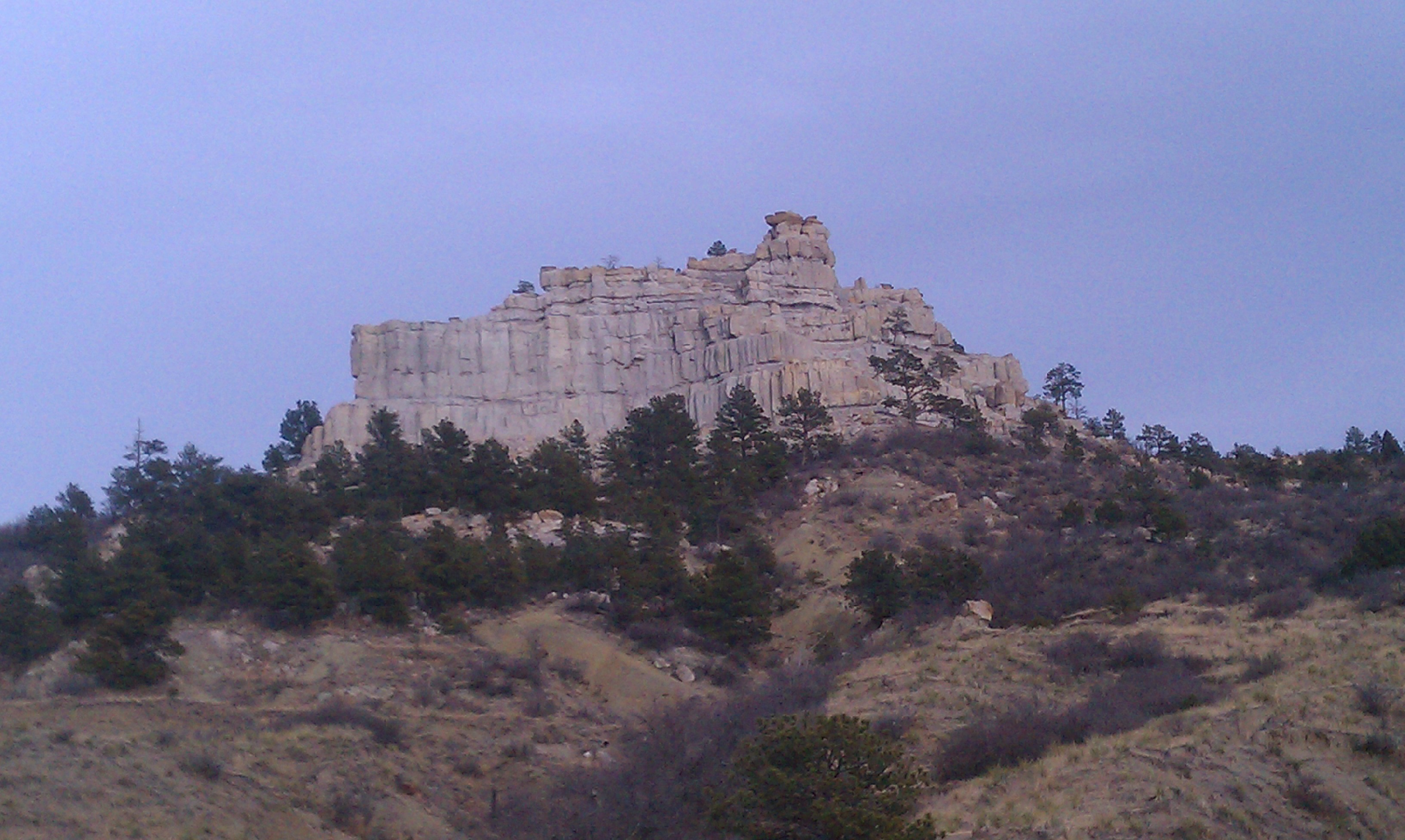
Pulpit Rock, in Pikeview (North Colorado Springs)

Garden of the Gods is on Colorado Springs's western edge. It is a National Natural Landmark, with 300 foot (91 m) red/orange sandstone rock formations often viewed against a backdrop of the snow-capped Pikes Peak. This park is free to the public and offers many recreational opportunities, such as hiking, rock climbing, cycling, horseback riding and tours. It offers a variety of annual events, one of the most popular of which is the Starlight Spectacular, a recreational bike ride held every summer to benefit the Trails and Open Space Coalition of Colorado Springs.

Colorado Springs has several major city parks, such as Palmer Park, America the Beautiful Park in downtown, Memorial Park, which includes many sports fields, an indoor swimming pool and skating rink, a skateboard bowl and a half-pipe, and Monument Valley Park, which has walking and biking paths, an outdoor swimming pool and pickleball courts. Monument Valley Park also has Tahama Spring, the original spring in Colorado Springs. Austin Bluffs Park affords a place of recreation in eastern Colorado Springs. El Paso County Regional Parks include Bear Creek Regional Park, Bear Creek Dog Park, Fox Run Regional Park and Fountain Creek Regional Park and Nature Center. Ponderosa pine (Pinus ponderosa), Gambel oak (Quercus gambelii), narrowleaf yucca (Yucca angustissima, syn. Yucca glauca) and prickly pear cactus (Opuntia macrorhiza).

=== Trails ===
Three trails, the New Santa Fe Regional Trail, Pikes Peak Greenway and Fountain Creek Regional Trail, form a continuous path from Palmer Lake, through Colorado Springs, to Fountain, Colorado. The majority of the trail between Palmer Lake and Fountain is a soft surface breeze gravel trail. A major segment of the trail within the Colorado Springs city limits is paved. The trails, except Monument Valley Park trails, may be used for equestrian traffic. Motorized vehicles are not allowed on the trails. Many of the trails are interconnected, having main spine trails, like the Pikes Peak Greenway, that lead to secondary trails.

== Government ==
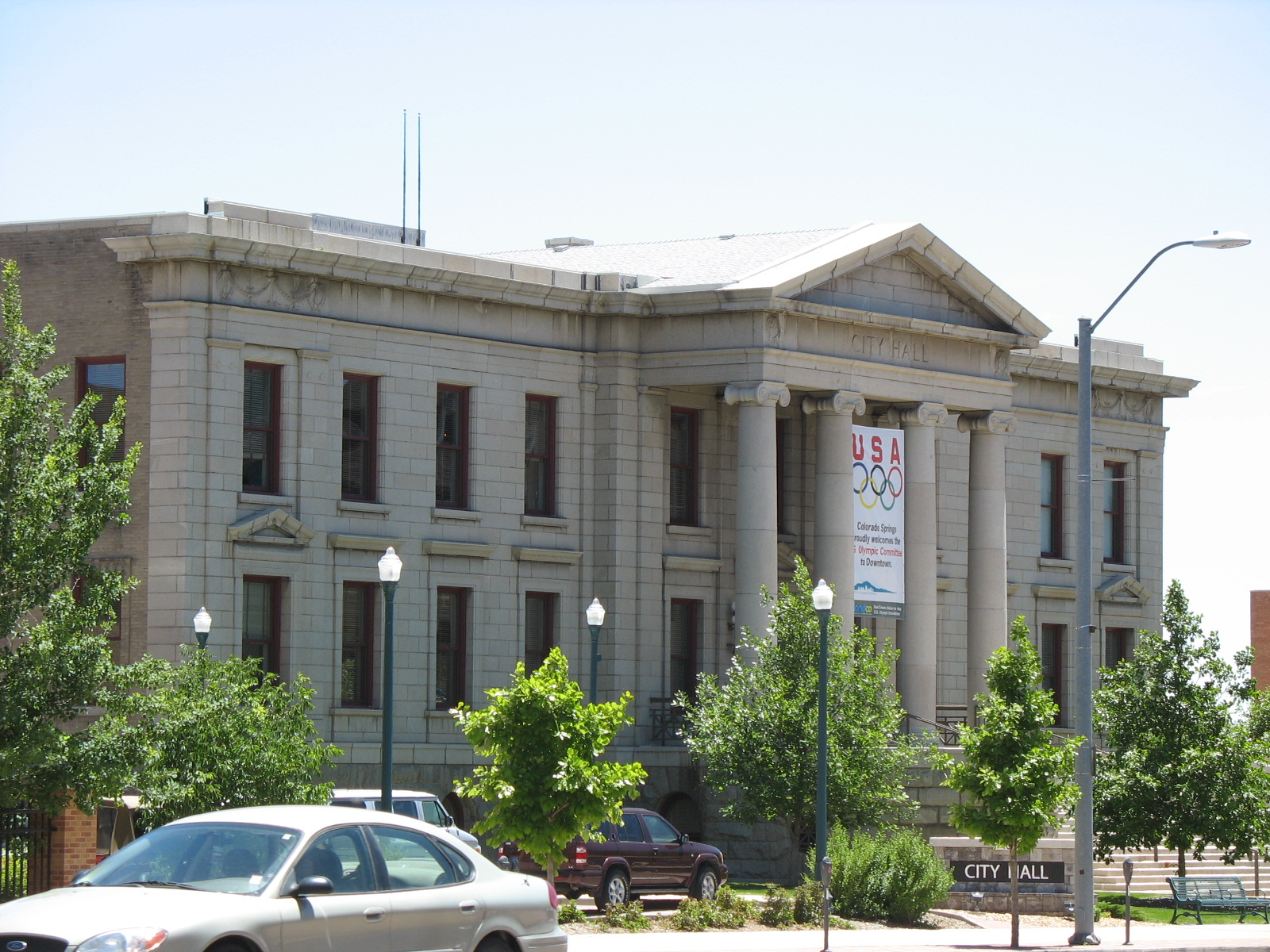
Colorado Springs City Hall

On November 2, 2010, Colorado Springs voters adopted a council-strong mayor form of government. The City of Colorado Springs transitioned to the new system of government in 2011. Under the council-strong mayor system of government, the mayor is the chief executive and the city council is the legislative branch. The mayor is a full-time elected position and not a member of the council. The council has nine members, six of whom represent one of six equally populated districts each. The remaining three members are elected at-large.

Colorado Springs City Hall was built from 1902 to 1904 on land donated by W. S. Stratton.

=== City Council ===
The Colorado Springs City Council is the legislative branch that governs the City of Colorado Springs. It has 3 members elected by the district at-large, with a combined total of 9 official members elected at-large, with a total 6 of the elected officials representing equally-populated quadrants. The current City Council president, Lynnette Crow-Iverson, was sworn in on April 14, 2025.

Members

- At-Large – Lynette Crow Iverson – Council President
- At-Large – Brian Risley – Council President Pro Tem
- At-Large – David Leinweber
- District 1 – Dave Donelson
- District 2 – Ken Casey
- District 3 – Brandy Williams
- District 4 – Kimberly Gold
- District 5 – Nancy Henjum
- District 6 – Roland Rainey

=== Politics ===
In 2017, Caleb Hannan wrote in Politico that Colorado Springs was "staunchly Republican", "a right-wing counterweight to liberal Boulder", and that a study ranked it "the fourth most conservative city in America". In 2016, Hannan wrote that downtown Colorado Springs had a different political vibe from the overall area's and that there were "superficial signs of changing demographics". However, since 2020, Colorado Springs has continued to shift towards the political center. In 2022, Governor Jared Polis won the city in his bid for reelection. In the 2023 mayoral election, independent candidate Yemi Mobolade handily won the race and became the first elected non-Republican mayor of the city. In the 2026 election the Democratic candidate Jessica Killin won Colorado's 5th congressional district, comprising Colorado Springs and its suburbs, by 5 points in a 14 point shift.

== Education ==
=== Primary and secondary education ===
Public schools The public education in the city is divided into several school districts:

- Colorado Springs School District 11 (center of the city)
- Academy School District 20 (north end)
- Falcon School District 49 (east side)
- Widefield School District 3 (south end)
- Fountain-Fort Carson School District 8 (far south end)
- Harrison School District 2 (south central area)
- James Irwin Charter High School (east central area)
- Cheyenne Mountain School District 12 (southwest corner)
- The Vanguard School, CIVA Charter High School and The Classical Academy are charter schools.

Private schools

- Roman Catholic Diocese of Colorado Springs schools including within the boundaries of the city
  - Corpus Christi Catholic School – PreK–8
  - Divine Redeemer Catholic School – PreK–8
  - St. Gabriel Classical Academy – PreK–3
  - St. Paul Catholic School – PreK–8
- St. Mary's High School – an independent Catholic high school
- Fountain Valley School of Colorado – a residential high school established in 1930 with a current enrollment of about 240.
- The Colorado Springs School – a preK–12 school established in 1962 with a current enrollment of about 300.
- Colorado Springs Christian Schools – A PreK–12th grade Christian school with two campuses started in 1972 and with an enrollment of about 1,150 in 2021.
- Evangelical Christian Academy – a preK–12 school established in 1971 with a current enrollment of about 350.
- Pikes Peak Christian School – a preK–12 Christian school with a current enrollment of about 210

In addition the state of Colorado runs the Colorado School for the Deaf and Blind, a residential school for people up to age 21 and established in 1874, in the city.

=== Higher education ===
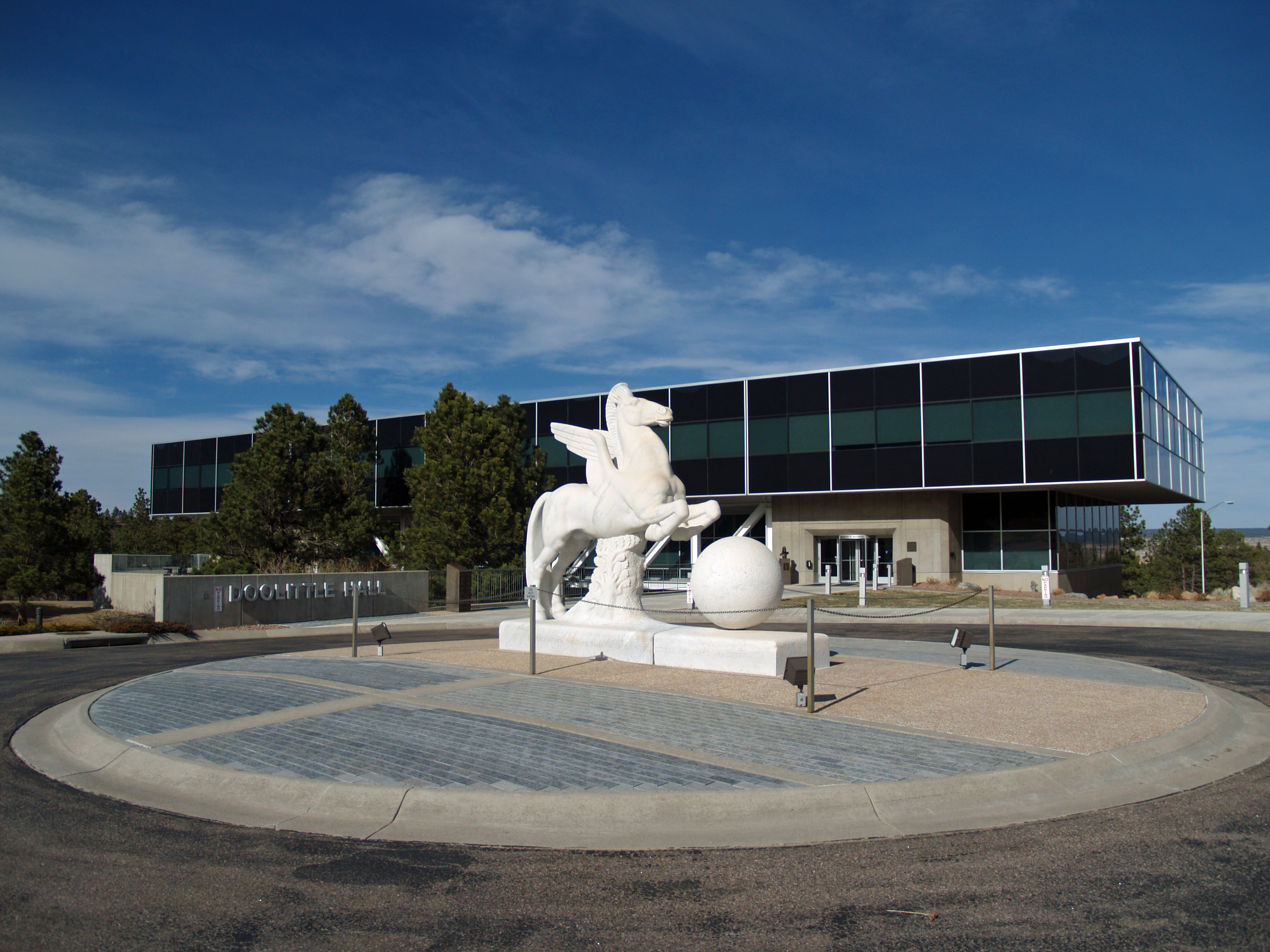
Doolittle Hall on the campus of the United States Air Force Academy

State institutions offering bachelors and graduate degree programs in Colorado Springs include the University of Colorado Colorado Springs (UCCS) with more than 12,000 students and Pikes Peak State College which offers mostly two-year degree associate degrees. The United States Air Force Academy is a federal institution offering bachelor's degrees for officer candidates.

Private non-profit institutions include Colorado College established in 1874 with about 2,000 undergraduates. Colorado Christian University has its Colorado Springs Center in the city.

Private for-profit institutions include Colorado Technical University whose main campus is in Colorado Springs and IntelliTec College a technical training school.

== Transportation ==
=== Roads ===
I-25 runs north and south through Colorado, and traverses the city for nearly 18 miles (29 km), entering the city south of Academy Blvd and exiting north of North Gate Boulevard. In El Paso County it is known as Ronald Reagan Highway. (Note: To combat congestion the Colorado Department of Transportation widened the Interstate 25 corridor throughout the city from four lanes (two in each direction) to six lanes in a program called COSMIX. Ultimately, the plan is to make the interstate eight lanes through the city when funding becomes available. Interstate 25 was expanded to 6 lanes between Woodmen Road (exit 149, the northern terminus for the COSMIX project) and Monument (exit 161).) An Interstate 25 bypass was approved in 2010.

A number of state and U.S. highways serve the city. State Highway 21 is a major east side semi-expressway from Black Forest to Fountain, known locally and co-signed as Powers Boulevard. State Highway 83 runs north–south from central Denver to northern Colorado Springs. State Highway 94 runs east–west from western Cheyenne County to eastern Colorado Springs where it terminates at US 24. US 24 is a major route through the city and county, providing access to Woodland Park via Ute Pass to the west and downtown, Nob Hill and numerous suburbs to the east. It is co-signed with Platte Ave after SH 21 and originally carried local traffic through town. The Martin Luther King Jr Bypass runs from I-25 near Circle Drive along Fountain Blvd to SH 21, then east again. State Highway 115 begins in Cañon City, traveling north along the western edge of Fort Carson; when it reaches the city limits it merges with Nevada Avenue, a signed Business Route of US 85. US 85 and SH 115 are concurrent between Lake Avenue and I-25. US 85 enters the city at Fountain and was signed at Venetucci Blvd, Lake Avenue, and Nevada Avenue (Note: In addition, there were plans to develop a "Front Range Toll Road", a privately owned turnpike, which would begin south of Pueblo and end around Fort Collins. This toll road would allow rail and truck traffic to avoid the more highly traveled parts of I-25 along the Front Range. Initially, the project had support but has since been highly contested because of the need to condemn the land of many private citizens, through the use of eminent domain, to make room for the corridor.) at various points in history; however most of US 85 is concurrent with I-25 and is not signed.

In 2004, the voters of Colorado Springs and El Paso County established the Pikes Peak Rural Transportation Authority.

=== Airport ===
Colorado Springs Airport (COS; ICAO: KCOS) has been in operation since 1925. It is the second-largest commercial airport in the state, after Denver International Airport (DEN; ICAO: KDEN). It covers 7,200 acres (2,900 ha) of land at an elevation of approximately 6,200 feet (1,900 m). COS is considered to be a joint-use civilian and military airport, as Peterson Space Force Base is a tenant of the airport. It has three paved runways: 17L/35R is 13,501 by 150 feet (4,115 by 46 m), the runway 17R/35L is 11,022 by 150 feet (3,360 by 46 m) and the runway 13/31 is 8,270 by 150 feet (2,521 by 46 m). The airport handled 2,134,618 passengers in 2022, and is served by American, Avelo, Delta, Southwest, Sun Country, and United.

=== Railroads ===
Freight service is provided by Union Pacific and BNSF.

Once an important hub, the city was once served by four Class 1 railroads, as well as a number of smaller operators, some of which were narrow gauge, and an extensive streetcar system, the Colorado Springs and Interurban Railway.

Currently there is no intercity passenger service; the last remaining services connecting the Front Range cities ceased with the formation of Amtrak in 1971. (Note: The last scheduled passenger service to Colorado Springs was the Denver to Dallas Texas Zephyr, which was cancelled on September 11, 1967.) Front Range Passenger Rail is a current proposal (as of 2023) to link the cities from Pueblo in the south, north to Fort Collins and possibly Cheyenne, Wyoming.

=== Bicycling ===
As of 2017, Colorado Springs has 121 miles (195 km) of bike lanes and 82 miles (132 km) of paved trails. PikeRide is a local electric bike-share program that operates in urban core, Old Colorado City, and Manitou Springs.

In April 2018, the Colorado Springs City Council approved a Bike Master Plan. The vision of the city's Bike Master Plan is "a healthy and vibrant Colorado Springs where bicycling is one of many transportation options for a large portion of the population, and where a well-connected and well-maintained network of urban trails, single-track, and on-street infrastructure offers a bicycling experience for present and future generations that is safe, convenient, and fun for getting around, getting in shape, or getting away."

Bike lanes in Colorado Springs have not been deployed without controversy. According to The Gazette, their readers "have mixed feelings for new bike lanes." In December 2016, the City removed a bike lane along Research Parkway due to overwhelming opposition; an online survey found that 80.5% of respondents opposed the bike lane. The Gazette has stated that since the Bike Master Plan was adopted by city council, "no issue has elicited more argument in The Gazette pages," and due to this immense public interest, on February 25, 2019, The Gazette hosted a town hall meeting called "Battle of the Bike Lanes".

=== Walkability ===
A 2011 study by Walk Score ranked Colorado Springs 34th most walkable of fifty largest U.S. cities.

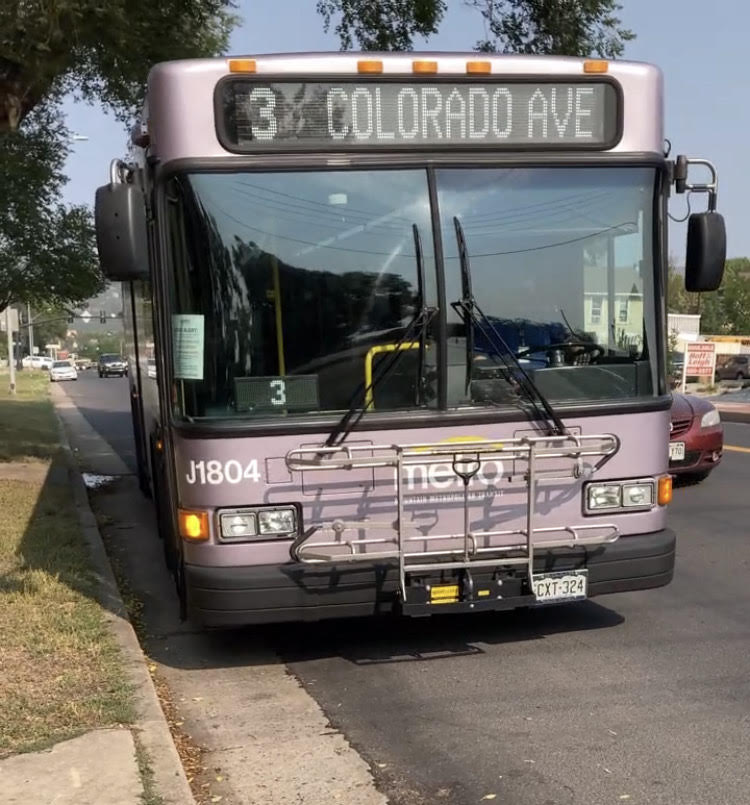
A Metro bus arrives at a stop on Colorado Avenue.

=== Buses ===
Mountain Metropolitan Transit (commonly referred to as MMT) is the primary public transportation provider for the Colorado Springs metropolitan region. MMT operates thirty-four bus routes, providing service for Colorado Springs, Manitou Springs, and Security-Widefield. The Downtown Terminal is the system's main hub, with the Citadel Mall, PPSC, and Chapel Hills Mall acting as secondary transfer stations.

Mountain Metro Mobility is an Americans with Disabilities Act (ADA) federally mandated complementary ADA paratransit service, which provides demand-response service for individuals with mobility needs that prevent them from using the fixed-route bus system.

Intercity bus service is available through the state-ran Bustang service and Greyhound. Bustang runs frequent trips to Denver, and daily trips to Lamar via Pueblo.

== Neighborhoods and historic places ==
- Banning Lewis Ranch Neighborhood
- Boulder Crescent Place Historic District
- Broadmoor Neighborhood
- Cragmor Neighborhood
- Historic Uptown Neighborhood
- Ivywild Neighborhood
- Knob Hill Neighborhood
- Middle Shooks Run Neighborhood
- Old Colorado City
- Old North End Historic District
- Papeton/Venetian Village Neighborhood
- Pikeview/Pinecliff Neighborhood
- Roswell Neighborhood
- Weber-Wahsatch Historic District

See also National Register of Historic Places in Colorado Springs, Colorado

== Sister cities ==
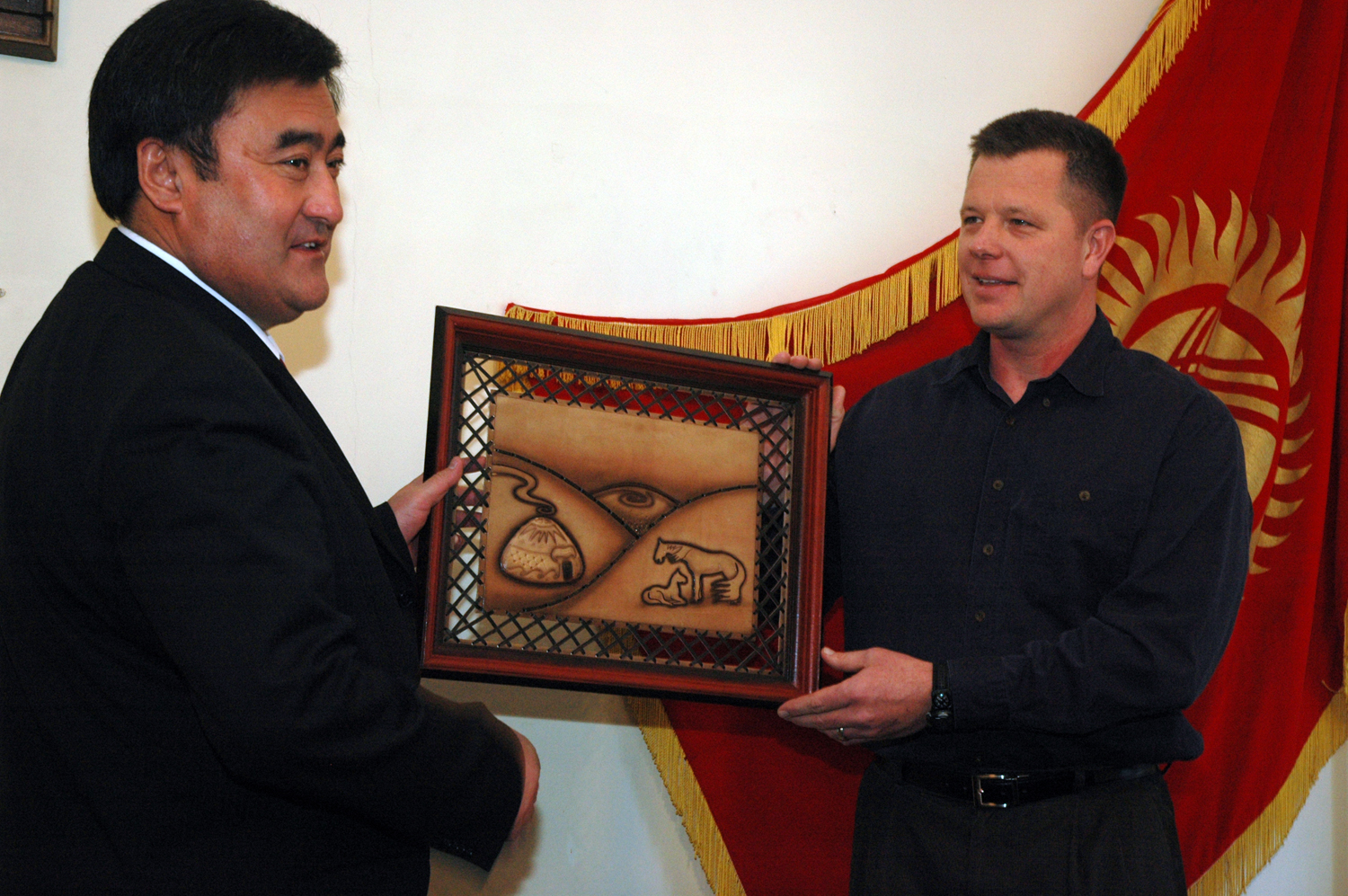
Bishkek mayor Arstanbek Nogoev presents a gift for Colorado Springs mayor Lionel Rivera to a US airman at Manas Air Base, in a ceremony aimed at reviving ties between the two sister cities.

Colorado Springs' sister cities are:

- Fujiyoshida, Yamanashi, Japan (1962)
- Kaohsiung, Taiwan (1983)
- Bishkek, Kyrgyzstan (1994)
- Nuevo Casas Grandes, Chihuahua, Mexico (1996)
- Canterbury-Bankstown, Sydney, Australia (1999)
- Olympia, Peloponnese, Greece (2014)
- Kranj, Slovenia (2022)

Suspended sistership

- Smolensk, Smolensk Oblast, Russia (1993–2022)

Colorado Springs's sister city organization began when it became partners with Fujiyoshida. The torii gate erected to commemorate the relationship stands at the corner of Bijou Street and Nevada Avenue, and is one of the city's most recognizable landmarks. The torii gate, crisscrossed bridge and shrine, in the median between Platte and Bijou Streets downtown, were a gift to Colorado Springs, erected in 1966 by the Rotary Club of Colorado Springs to celebrate the friendship between the two communities. A plaque near the torii gate states that "the purpose of the sister city relationship is to promote understanding between the people of our two countries and cities". The Fujiyoshida Student exchange program has become an annual event.

In 2006 and 2010, the Bankstown TAP (Talent Advancement Program) performed with the Youth Symphony and the Colorado Springs Children's Chorale as part of the annual "In Harmony" program. A notable similarity between Colorado Springs and its sister cities is their geographic positions: three of the seven cities are near the foot of a major mountain or mountain range, as is Colorado Springs.

== See also ==
- Colorado Springs, CO Metropolitan Statistical Area
- List of county seats in Colorado
- Media in Colorado Springs, Colorado
- Tuberculosis treatment in Colorado Springs
