= Cultural Office of the Pikes Peak Region =

The Cultural Office of the Pikes Peak Region (COPPeR) is a certified nonprofit arts organization located in downtown Colorado Springs, Colorado and serving El Paso and Teller counties. In February 2014, Andy Vick replaced Christina McGrath as COPPeR's executive director. COPPeR receives funding from the city of Colorado Springs and from various grants. It acts as an umbrella artistic service, "the lead entity for centralizing and coordinating information about cultural services in the Pikes Peak region of Colorado." COPPeR conceptualizes itself as an adhesive that unifies the greater arts community to make arts and culture more dynamic and powerful than any one organization. COPPeR invites and engages residents and visitors to draw them into the local arts scene; it advocates for all of the arts; and it builds the cultural community to create a regional brand.

COPPeR is one of more than 200 nonprofit arts organizations that generate about US$100 million every year in the Colorado Springs area. Out of 276 metropolitan areas ranked according to their arts businesses per capita, Colorado Springs is in the top 15 percent. In September 2010, partly inspired by Dream City Vision 2020, COPPeR released a 10-year cultural plan in for the Pikes Peak region.

== PeakRadar website ==
In 2007, a study by the Colorado Council on the Arts placed creative industries as the fifth largest sector of the Colorado state budget. In 2009, the Council had to cut a fourth of the state arts budget, and arts organizations in El Paso and Teller counties received $90,400 instead of the $183,490 they had gotten in 2008. The local convention and visitor bureau began to concentrate more on culture in the Pikes Peak region. When the Colorado Tourism Office awarded the local tourism office with a grant of $15,000, the local office matched $7,500 to give to COPPeR. COPPeR used this funding to create the cultural events website at PeakRadar.com.

The website become COPPeR's central tool for supporting and promoting the arts. It now serves as a guide to arts and cultural events throughout the Colorado Springs area, including Teller and El Paso counties. PeakRadar provides event listings, directories, classifieds, and artist profiles.

== Partnerships and projects ==
COPPeR partners with Americans for the Arts (AFTA), described as "the nation's leading nonprofit organization for advancing the arts in America," to conduct arts-related research, development, programs, and services. Specifically, COPPeR has participated in a large-scale local arts index of resources and assets to be compared with the resources and assets of other similarly-sized cities. AFTA plans to compile all this data to make comparisons across cities and determine how arts programs and budgets can be improved. COPPeR has also surveyed attendees at various arts events as part of an AFTA-based study of the economic impact of arts events on their surrounding community.

In addition to partnering with AFTA, COPPeR also works with various programs in the city of Colorado Springs, including the Colorado Springs Chamber of Commerce, the Pikes Peak Poet Laureate Project, and the Quality of Life Indicators Project, conducted through the United Way of America. COPPeR and PeakRadar events are regularly featured in local newspapers The Gazette and the Colorado Springs Business Journal. COPPeR has media partnerships with regional radio stations KRCC and KCME. It also works closely with the Colorado Springs Fine Arts Center and the Bee Vradenburg Foundation focused on sustaining arts in the region.

== Reaction to recession ==
Lasting effects from the Great Recession led many arts communities, notably that of Kansas to cut funding for the arts. In response, arts communities like that of Colorado Springs have made efforts to demonstrate the importance of the arts in education, publicity, marketing, tourism, and regional branding. COPPeR provides a forum for artists and arts organizations to band together in advocating for the arts.
