= Flag of Colorado Springs, Colorado =

Flag of Colorado Springs
- Use: Municipal flag
- Proportion: 3:5
- Adopted: July 26, 1912
- Design: White field with a blue border; field contains an off-centered diamond-shaped emblem.
- Designed by: Caroline Spencer; Nicolaas van den Arend

The flag of Colorado Springs is white with a blue border on top, bottom, and fly. On the hoist side is a diamond shape with a depiction of the sun setting behind the mountains fimbriated in green.

The flag was offered to the Colorado Springs city council in 1912 by Caroline Spencer, representing the Civic League. According to Flags of the World, "The white field is intended to represent the cleanliness and health of the city; the blue border our blue skies; the shield carries the sun, of which we are justly proud; the mountains stand for Pikes Peak and on it are pictured the gold ingots of our mining industries; the green band about the shield represents the park system surrounding the city."

In a 2004 review by the North American Vexillological Association of 150 U.S. city flags, the Colorado Springs city flag was ranked nineteenth best.
