= IntelliTec College =

American for-profit technical training school

Coordinates: 38.832125°N 104.787053°W

- Established: 1965
- Location: Colorado Springs, Colorado; Pueblo, Colorado; Grand Junction, Colorado, United States
- Website: Official website

IntelliTec College is a for-profit technical career training school with locations in Colorado Springs, Colorado, Pueblo, Colorado, Grand Junction, Colorado, and Albuquerque, New Mexico. Started in 1965, the college has been in operation for more than sixty years. IntelliTec Colleges’ mission is to build a better community through quality and excellence in career training.

== Academics ==
IntelliTec College provides career training in Colorado and New Mexico with associate degrees (occupational) and professional certificate programs. Campuses are located in Colorado Springs, Grand Junction, Albuquerque, and Pueblo. In October 2023, they also purchased IBMC College, which has three locations in Colorado. (Fort Collins, Greeley and Longmont) & in January 2025 Euphoria Institute of Beauty Arts and Sciences in Las Vegas, Nevada. All four locations are branch campuses of IntelliTec College in Colorado Springs.

== Accreditation ==
IntelliTec College is accredited by the Accrediting Commission of Career Schools and Colleges (https://www.accsc.org/directory/). All of the IntelliTec College campuses are regulated by the Department of Education and local state entities (Colorado Department of Higher Education - DPOS: https://highered.colorado.gov/Data/InstSelect.aspx?division=DPOS; Colorado Department of Regulatory Agencies - DORA: https://dora.colorado.gov/public-information; New Mexico Higher Education Department - NMHED: https://hed.state.nm.us/resources-for-schools/private-post-secondary-schools/private-post-secondary-school-directory; New Mexico Regulation and Licensing Department (Massage): http://www.rld.state.nm.us/boards/Massage_Therapy.aspx).

== Campus locations ==
- Pueblo Campus
- Colorado Springs Campus
- Grand Junction Campus
- Albuquerque Campus
