= Fountain Creek Regional Park and Nature Center =

Fountain Creek Nature Center
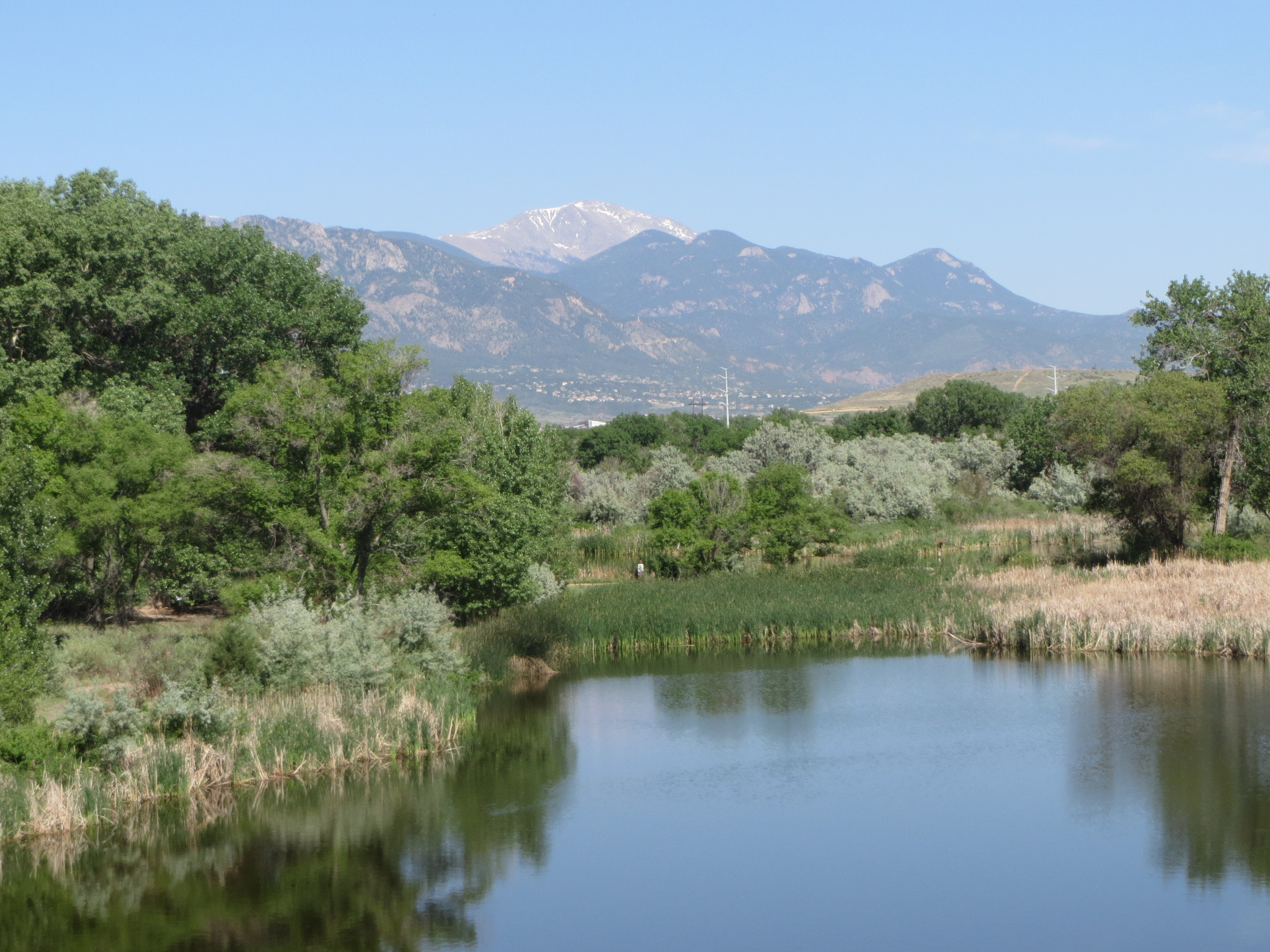
- Fountain Creek Nature Center, with Pikes Peak in the distance

- Location: Peppergrass Lane, Fountain, CO
- Coordinates: 38°42′49.15″N 104°42′56.71″W
- Operator: El Paso County, Colorado

Fountain Creek Regional Park and Nature Center is a park and nature center in Fountain, El Paso County, Colorado near Colorado Springs.

== Overview ==
The park is free with a nature center and nature trails for hiking, leashed pet walking and horseback riding. The nature center is open Tuesday through Saturday.

The park's ponds and springs are a sanctuary to waterfowl, wildlife and birds, like red-winged blackbirds.

== Gallery ==
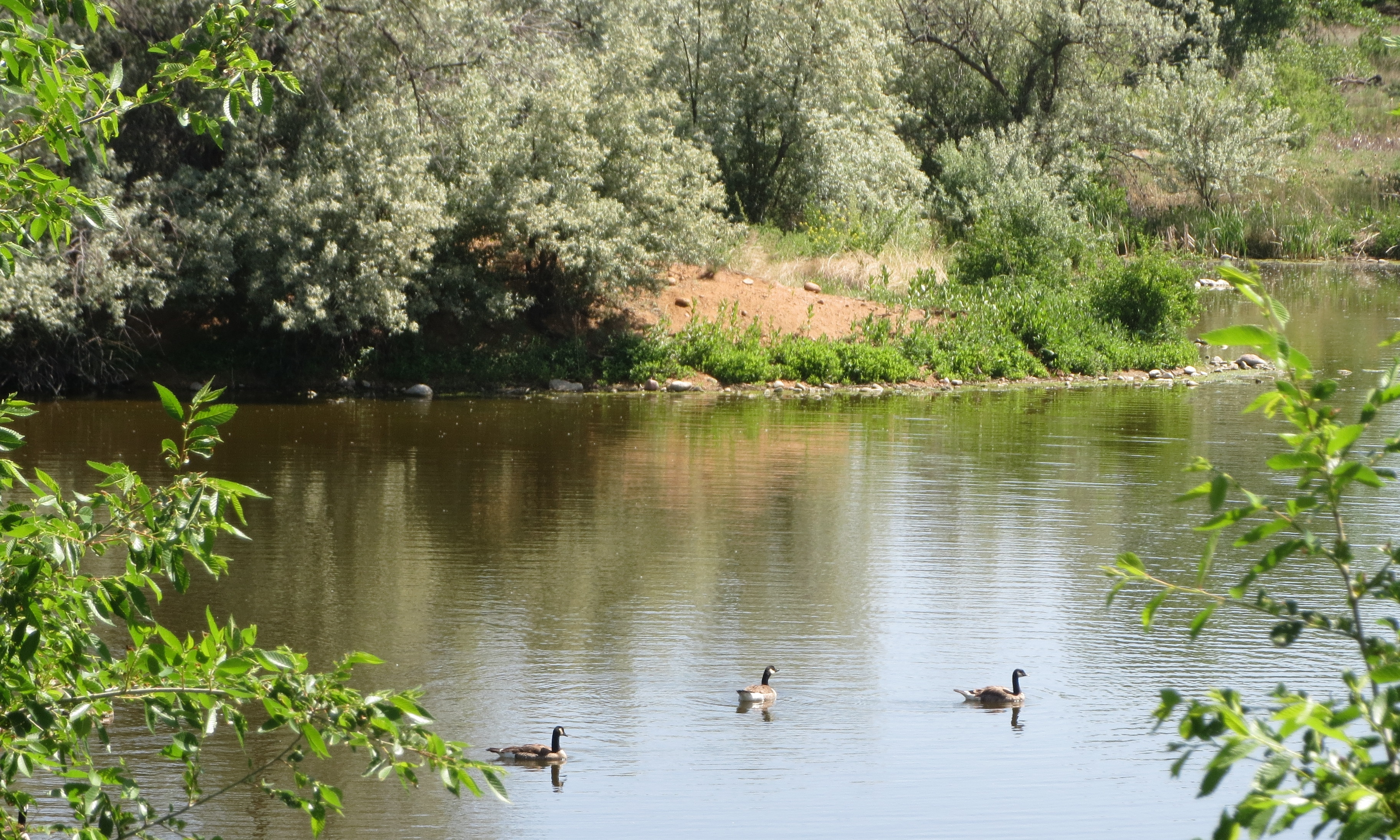
Fountain Creek Nature Center

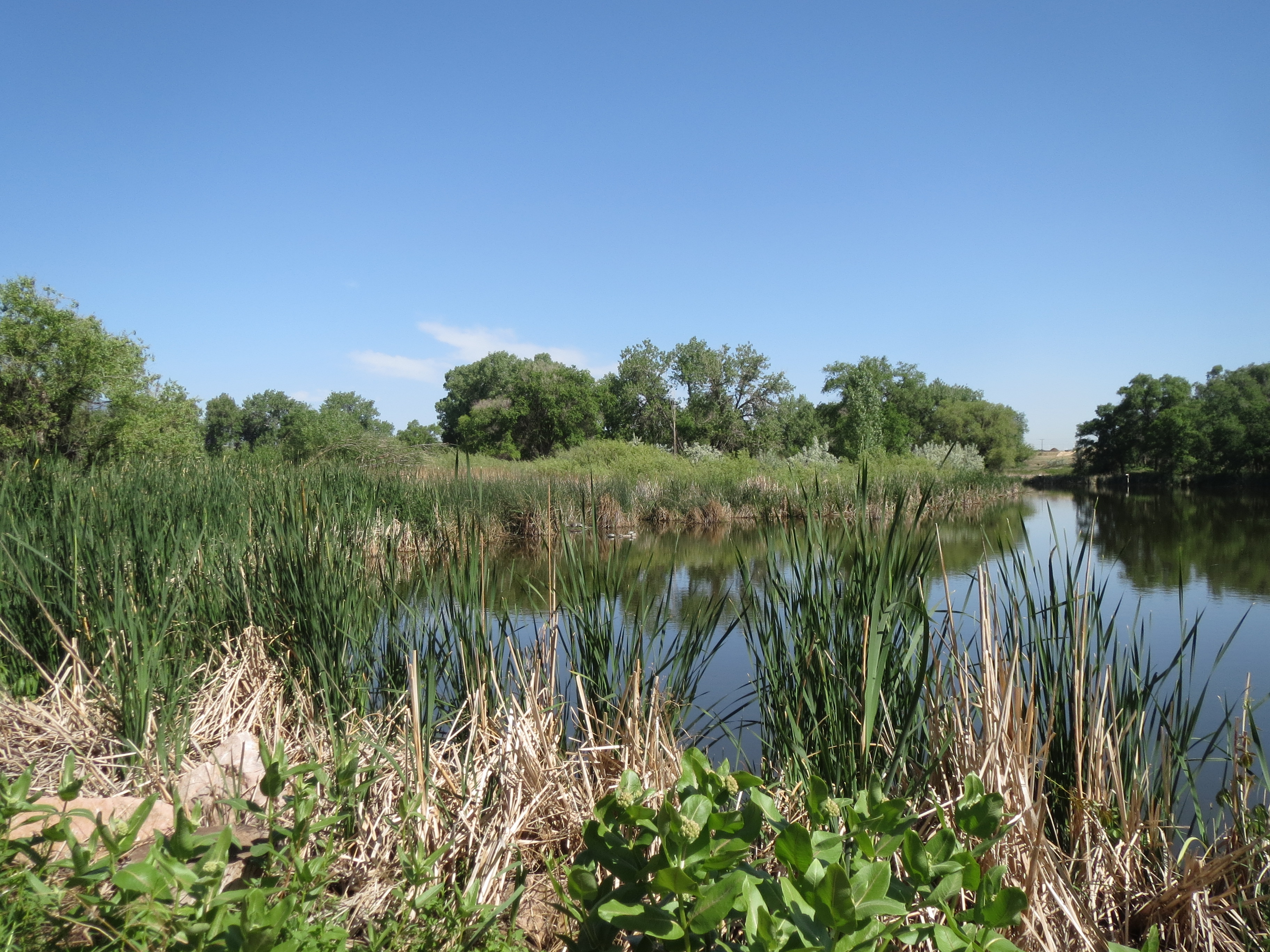
Fountain Creek Nature Center

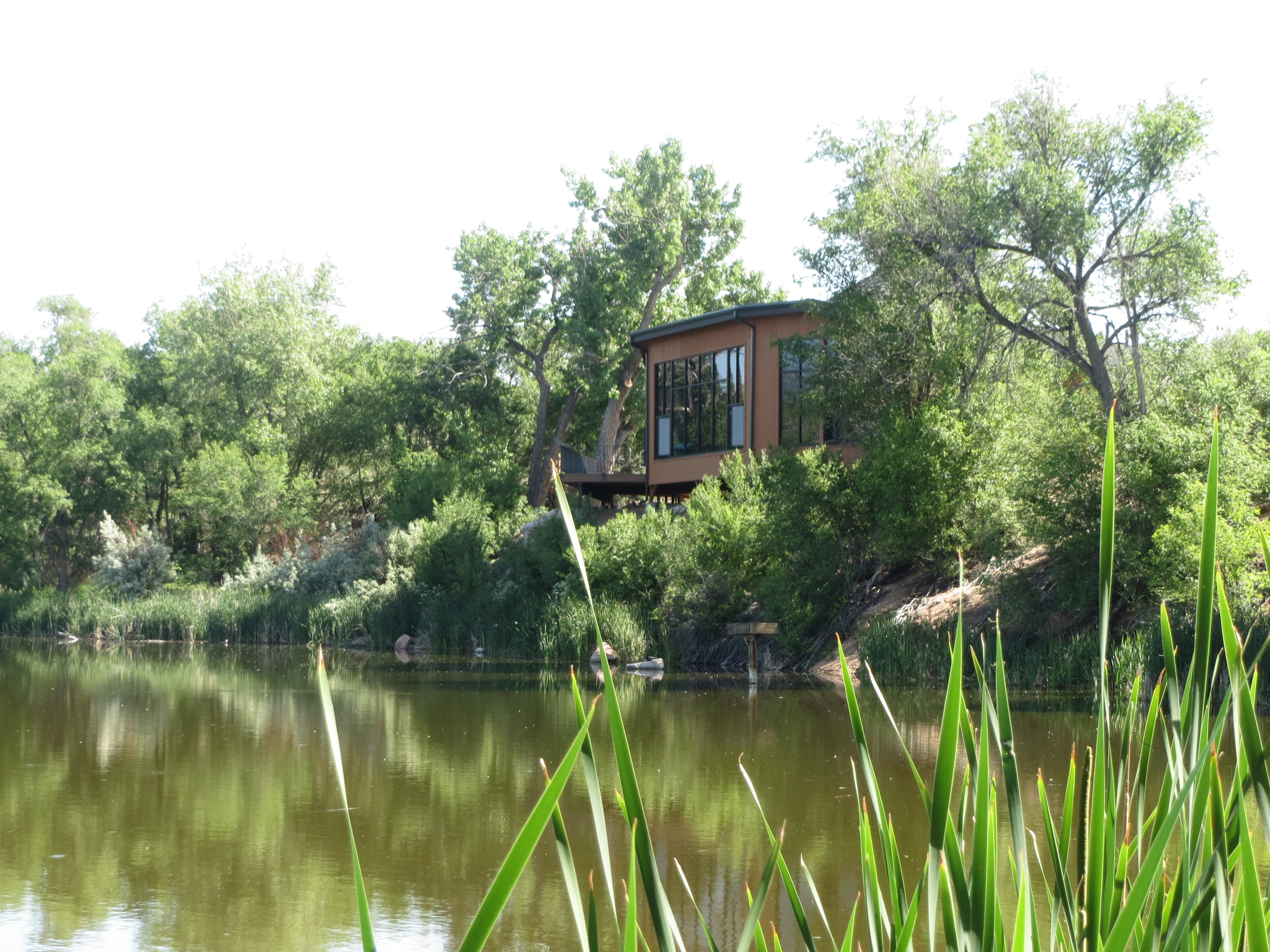
Fountain Creek Nature Center

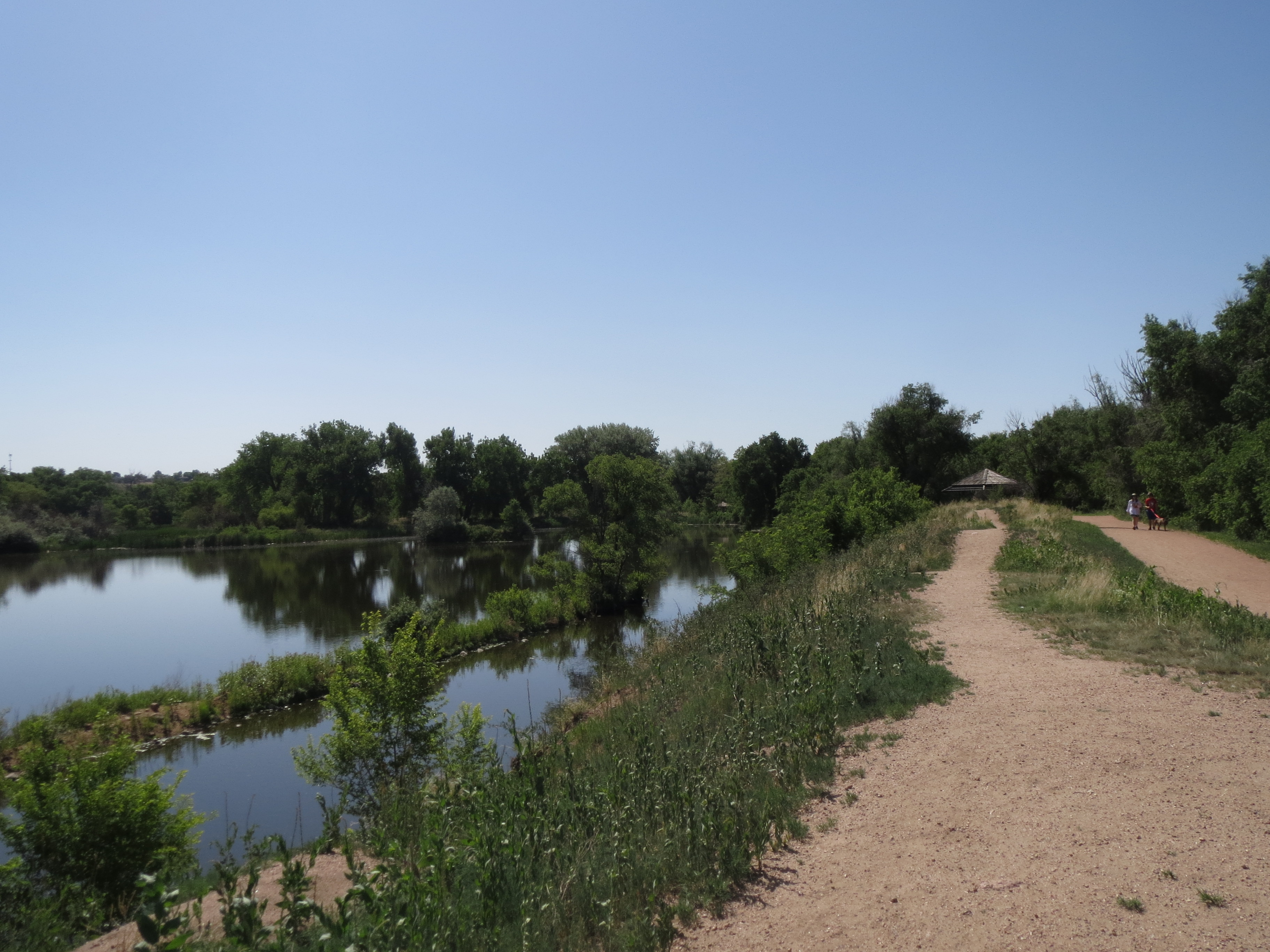
Fountain Creek Nature Center

== See also ==
- Bear Creek Regional Park and Nature Center, the other Colorado Springs area Nature Center
