= VisionTrust =

International non-profit organization

VisionTrust International Logo

VisionTrust is an international, non-denominational non-profit organization that assists orphaned and vulnerable children around the world. The organization works alongside local Christians to help children gain an education, nutritional support, medical assistance, and spiritual discipleship. VisionTrust works in schools, Transitional Homes (orphanages), and Learning Centers. They offer child sponsorships, short-term mission trips, and assist churches with educational materials to promote participation in this effort. VisionTrust is headquartered in Colorado Springs, Colorado.

== History ==
VisionTrust International began its ministry in 1997 when Dr. Ernie Taylor acted on his desire to help orphans in Myanmar and impoverished children living in the slums of the Dominican Republic. In 2013, Matthew Storer accepted the role of CEO from the founder, Taylor. In 2018, Devlin Donaldson became President/CEO.

== Countries of operation ==
As of July 2018, the ministry has expanded to serve in 15 countries, including: Brazil, Central African Republic, Dominican Republic, Guatemala, Haiti, India, Liberia, Malawi, Myanmar, Peru, Tanzania, Thailand, Togo, and Zimbabwe.

== Number of children assisted ==
As of September 2014, VisionTrust assists over 15,000 children through Learning Centers, Schools, and Transitional Homes.

== Programs ==
=== Child sponsorships ===
Monthly sponsorships are available. Sponsorships provide a child with food, medical care, and spiritual nurturing. Sponsors and their sponsored children are encouraged to write to each other.

=== Short-term mission trips ===
VisionTrust organizes mission trips for churches, college students, families, professionals and sponsors to serve children in poverty around the world. Mission trips focus on one or more of the following categories:
Labor: Construction, painting, and/or maintenance of a school, Transitional Home, or Learning Center.
Evangelism: Vacation Bible Schools (VBS) or ministries designed for children, discipleship training, and street evangelism.
Child Health: Dental and health care teams committed to health promotion and disease prevention in partnership with local health care providers.
Camps: Sports clinics and camps.
Combination: A specialized trip blending the above team types.

=== Advocacy ===
1) Sponsorship Drives are used to promote monthly sponsorships of impoverished children around the world.

== Accountability ==
VisionTrust is a 501(c)(3) not-for-profit organization. No individual owns any stock in the corporation, which is held for charitable purposes. The board of directors at large serves without compensation for three-year rotating terms. VisionTrust is a member of the Evangelical Council on Financial Accountability and holds a rating of four out of four stars from Charity Navigator.
