= Geography of Colorado Springs, Colorado =

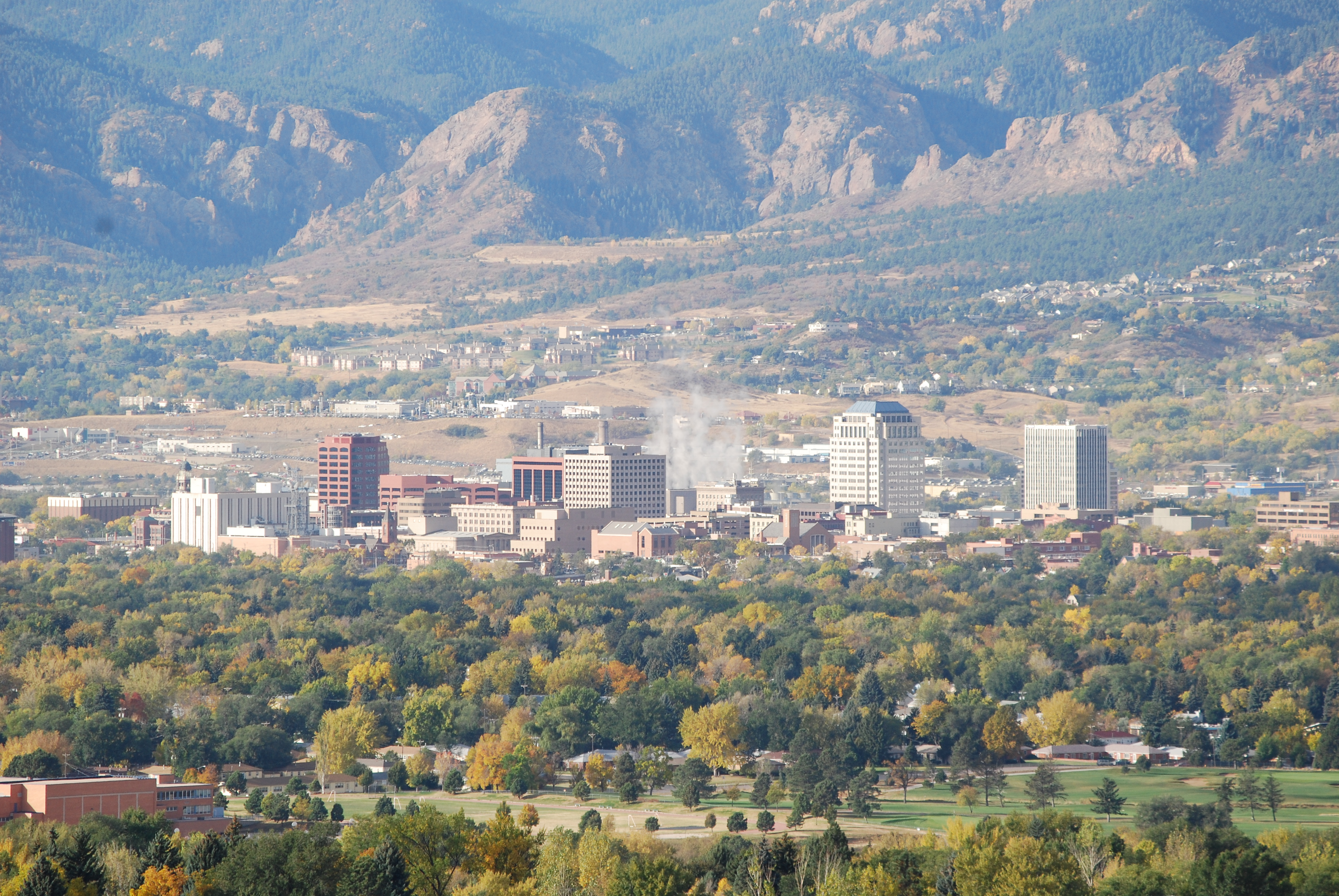
Downtown Colorado Springs, looking west to Rampart Range

Colorado Springs geography describes geographical topics regarding the city of Colorado Springs, Colorado in El Paso County, Colorado. With 194.87 sq mi (504.7 km^{2}) of land, it is the state's largest-sized city. Denver is the most populated city.

== Physical geography ==
Colorado Springs is located in the Pikes Peak area in El Paso County, along the Front Range a forty-mile corridor from the city up to Fort Carson. At the edge of the southern Rocky Mountains, it is bordered by State, National Forest Service, and Bureau of Land Management land. North of the city is the Palmer Divide, the plains and grasslands are to the east, and Pueblo and high desert lands lie to the south. The city was founded at the confluence of Monument Creek with Fountain Creek of the Arkansas River watershed. Its major highway is Interstate 25 that runs along that Front Range Urban Corridor to Castle Rock, Denver, Fort Collins, and Pueblo.

Colorado Springs, with an average rainfall of about 15-16 inches, has a semi-arid climate with relatively mild temperatures. The terrain is drier south of the city. Colorado Springs is 6,035 feet (1,839 m) in elevation.

== Topography ==
The city, founded near the confluence of Fountain and Monument Creeks, primarily on Pierre Shale. On the eastern side of the city are hills of Tertiary and Cretaceous sandstone. Sandstone ledges are Dakota Formation. Pedimont rock is prevalent in the north portion of the city. There are pediment gravels on the west side. The mountains have been quarried for limestone.

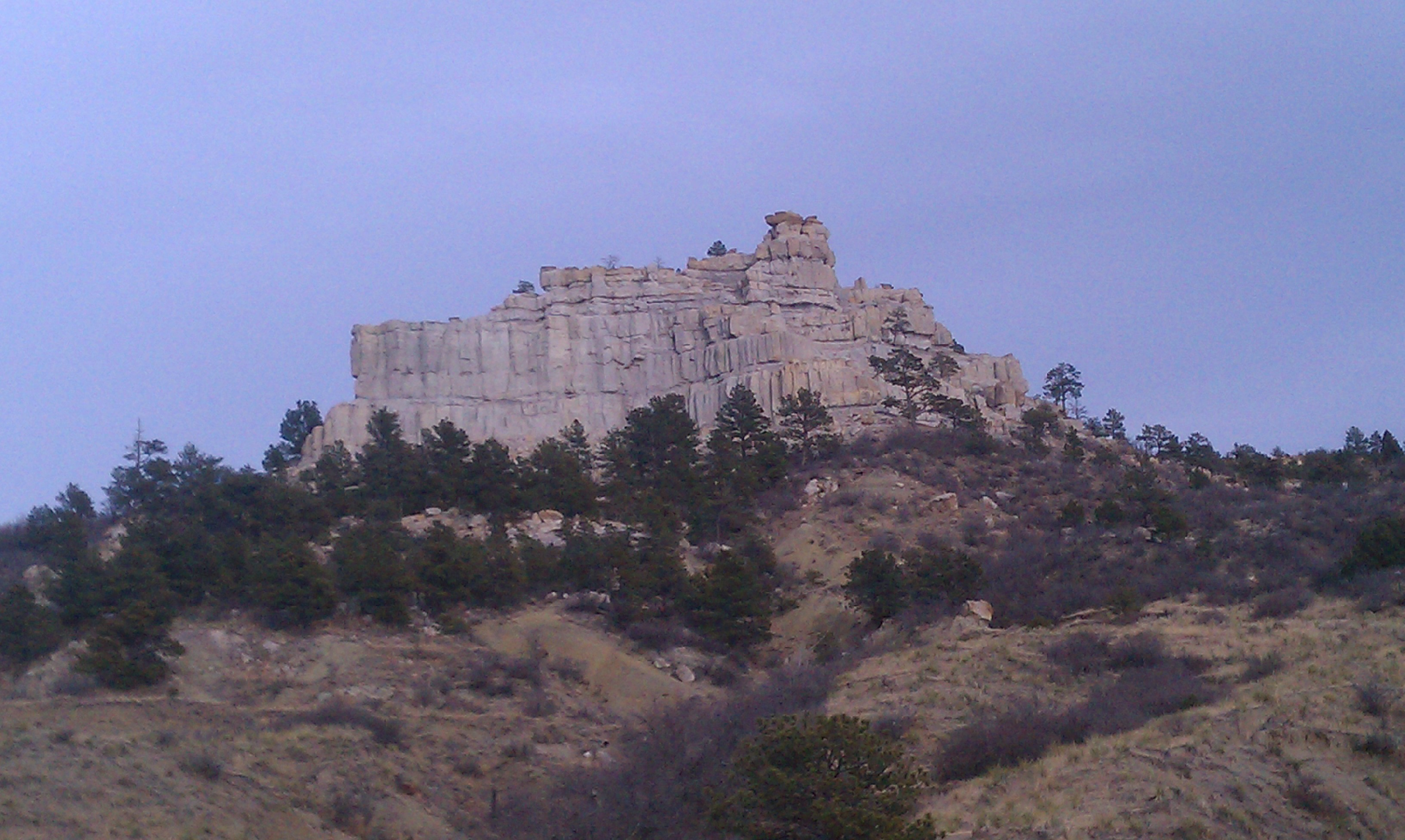
Pulpit Rock, northeastern part of the city

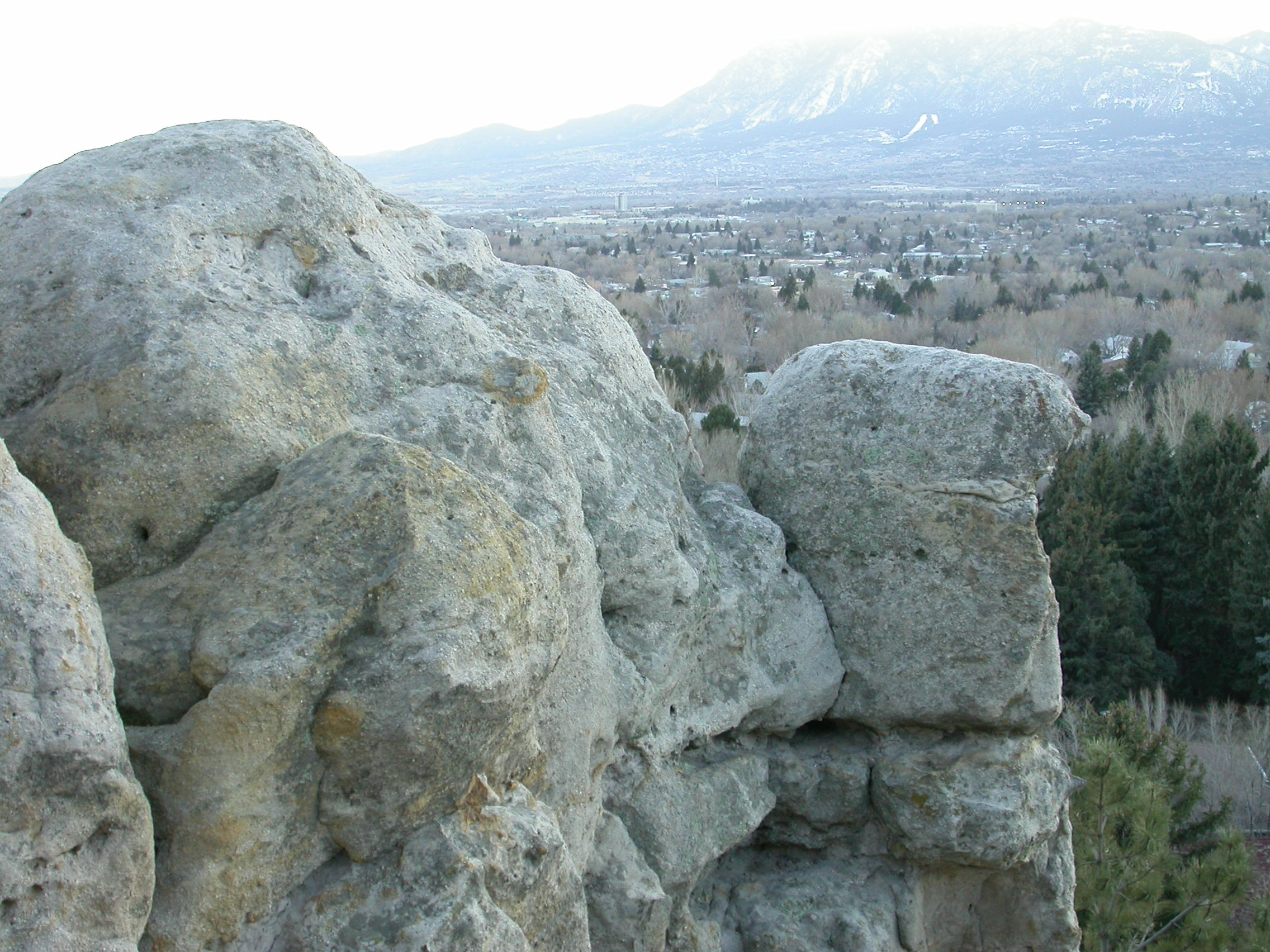
Palmer Park, northeastern part of the city

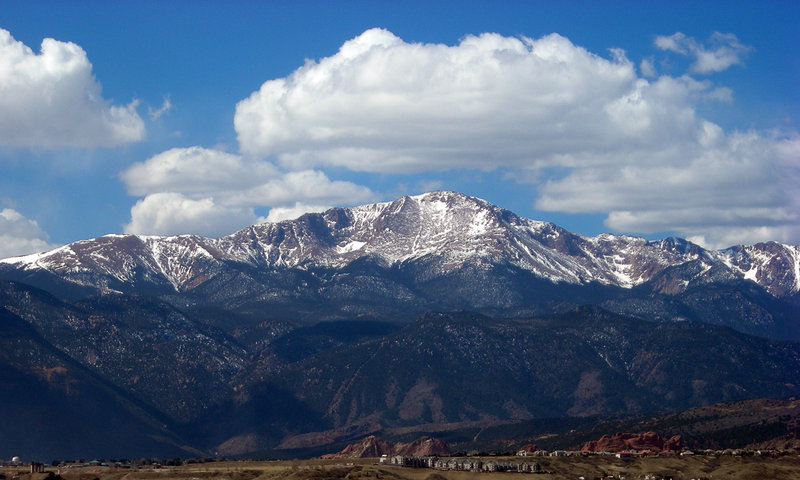
Pikes Peak looking west from the University of Colorado Colorado Springs campus

Scenic Pennsylvanian rock formations are found at Garden of the Gods. The natural gap between the sandstone Austin Bluffs is Templeton Gap, and a few westernmost portions of the city are on the east escarpment's slope of the Southern Rocky Mountains section adjacent to the Colorado Piedmont, separated by the Fall line of the Front Range.

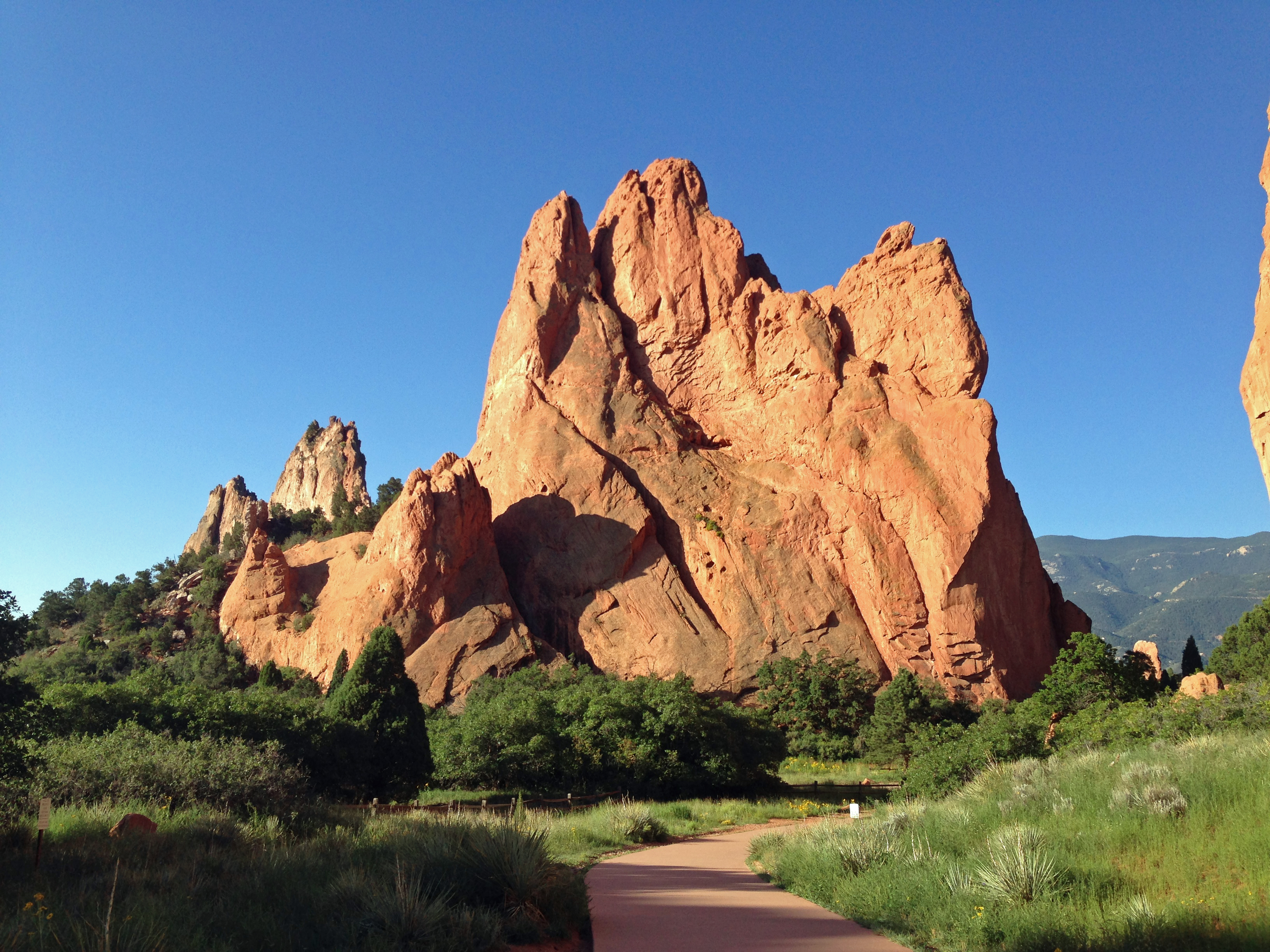
Garden of the Gods

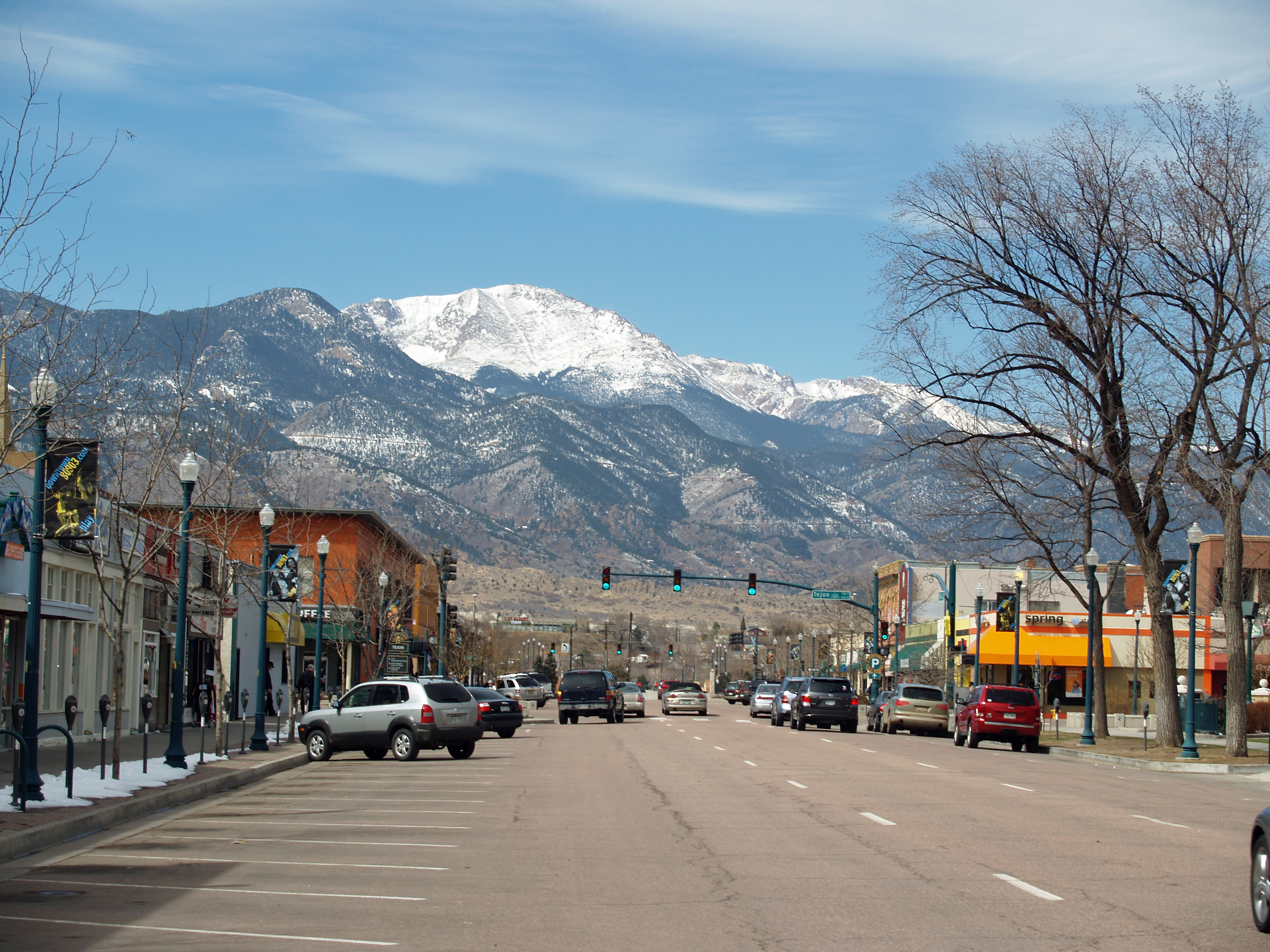
Downtown Colorado Springs

== Land use ==
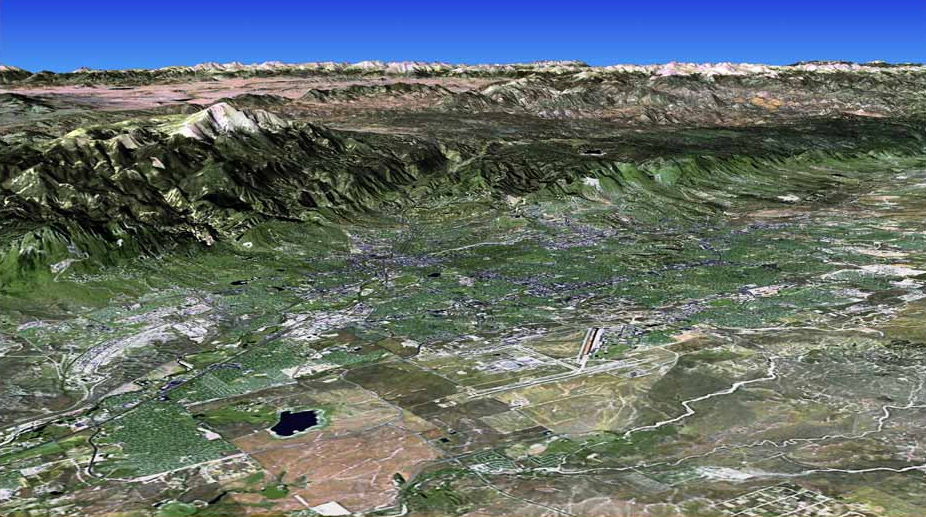
Three-dimensional view of Colorado Springs. Pikes Peak and Cheyenne Mountain are in the top left quadrant, Rampart Range is in the upper right quadrant, the airport is in the lower right quadrant, Fort Carson, and the Big Johnson reservoir is in the left quadrant. Pike National Forest is the western portion of Cheyenne Mountain and much of the rest of the Pikes Peak mountainous area.

Colorado Springs is 70 miles south of Denver, which has the largest population of any city in Colorado. Colorado Springs has the largest area of any city in the state, with 194.87 square miles (504.7 km^{2}) in 2013. Of that, 132 square miles (340 km^{2}) is developed land. It has 16,331 parkland acres and 7,431 street land miles.

Colorado Springs Land Use (2012 percentage)
1. Vacant / agricultural (32.0%)
2. Residential (26.0%)
3. Commercial (8.00%)
4. Institutional (9.00%)
5. Parks, trails, and open space (9.00%)
6. Other (16.0%)

=== Residential ===
Of the city's land, 26% is residential. The higher the percentage, the greater the demand and total costs for city services, like recreational and park facilities. The population growth has been significant since the 1970s.

=== Institutional and commercial ===
Institutional and commercial property use a total of about 17% of the city's land. The city, once an urban-industrial society, has become a modern-technological one.

Military facilities in Colorado Springs include North American Aerospace Defense Command (NORAD), United States Air Force Academy, Peterson Air Force Base, and Fort Carson.

=== Parks ===
The city owns more than 15,000 acres of open space and park, including Garden of the Gods, and Palmer Park, and North Cheyenne Cañon Park. There are more than 6,000 acres of open space land, 8,000 acres of parkland, and about 300 miles of trails in Colorado Springs and the nearby area. The city, which borders national and state park lands, has canyons, bluffs, mesas, rock formations, treed foothills, mountain creeks, and grasslands. The city's Parks, Recreation, and Cultural Services Department also manages urban forest, two golf courses, recreation centers and programs, and the Pikes Peak Highway.

=== Hydrology ===
About 1% of the city's land is water. Colorado Springs is located within the 927 square miles (2,400 km^{2}) Fountain Creek Watershed, which is part of the Arkansas River watershed to the south. Fountain Creek's source is northwest of the city near Woodland Park. It meets up with Monument Creek in Colorado Springs and Fountain Creek then flows downstream to Pueblo, where is merges into the Arkansas River. Other creeks in the area are Bear Creek, Sand Creek, and Cottonwood Creek. There are two natural lakes and five reservoirs. The bodies of water are important for recreation, like hiking and fishing, and serve as wildlife habitats. Wetlands, like Tejon Marsh and Monument Valley Park, provide habitat for wildlife, birds, and fish. Water from the nearby mountain provide the city's water supply.

Initiatives have been implemented to ensure water quality, improve water drainage, and optimize recreational use. In 2011, the Fountain Creek Watershed completed its master plan to limit pollution entering the stream. It also implemented programs for educational experiences, recreational activities, and stable wetlands. Trails were created and improved along Fountain Creek within Colorado Springs and to Pueblo. Adopt-a-Waterway is managed by the city's Stormwater Engineering Department to keep the trails and waterways clean.

=== Vacant and agricultural land ===
The largest land use category is vacant and agricultural land at 32% in 2012 of land in the city. More than half of the land (57%) in this category is in the 24,000 acre Banning Lewis Ranch on the city's eastern edge. Another key geographical location for future development is the northern edge of Colorado Springs. Like Pueblo and Denver, undeveloped land in and around the city is often used for livestock grazing and farming.

=== Other ===
This general category includes golf courses, cemeteries, and road right of way.

== See also ==
- Colorado Springs metropolitan area
- Front Range Urban Corridor
- History of Colorado Springs, Colorado
- Parks, open spaces and trails
  - List of parks in Colorado Springs, Colorado
  - Parks in Colorado Springs, Colorado
  - Pikes Peak Greenway
- Pikes Peak

== External map ==
- Colorado Springs neighborhood map
