= Edgerton, Colorado =

Ghost town in El Paso County, Colorado, United States

Coordinates: 38.9606°N 104.8359°W

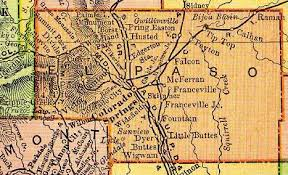
Early El Paso County Colorado map. Edgerton was between Monument and Colorado Springs, Colorado and its site is now south of the Air Force Academy.

Edgerton is an extinct town at the confluence of Monument Creek and West Monument Creek eight miles (13 km) north of present-day Colorado Springs in El Paso County, Colorado, United States. It was across from Black Forest. The Edgerton post office operated from June 16, 1870, until August 28, 1902.

== Stage station and hotel ==
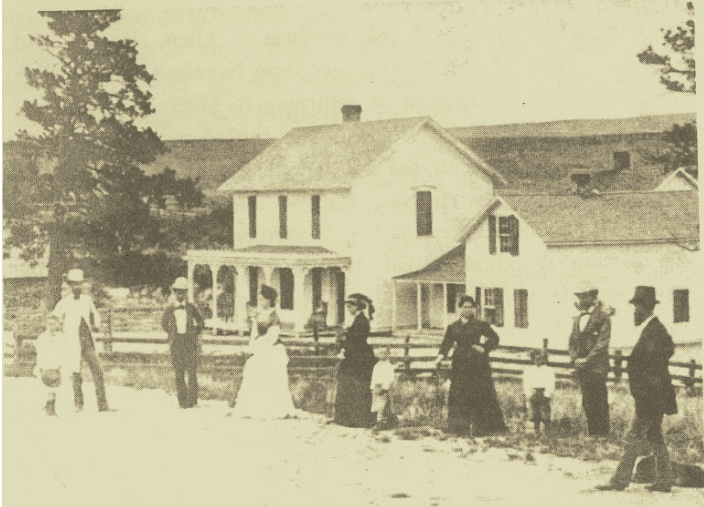
Edgerton Hotel, also known as Teachout Hotel, in the late 19th century

In the 1860s, Edgerton Hotel was established as the first stage station north of Old Colorado City on the route to Denver. The stage coach horses were swapped for fresh horses at the station. The station and two-story Edgerton Hotel, along old Camp Creek Road, were run by Leafy Teachout and her son, Harlow. The site of the hotel, stables, and stone barn are in a meadow along the Santa Fe Regional Trail. There are some ruins of the stone foundations.

== Native Americans ==
Of the Native Americans who were in the area, the Ute people were friendly. They sold beads to settlers and would sometimes get a free meal of biscuits. The Cheyenne and Arapaho were hostile to the settlers, who make their houses to be like fortresses–make of stone and wooden walls as much as three-feet-(0.9-meter)-thick. Some had narrow slots just wide enough to use to shoot a rifle from inside the house. Families would huddle together during uprisings. In 1868, there were raids by Native Americans, who stole 150 horses from Harlow Teachout, and two young boys were killed in another raid.

== Railroad station and early village years ==
The Denver and Rio Grande Railroad was constructed east of Monument Creek in 1870 and the Edgerton, Colorado, post office opened on June 16, 1870. In 1872, David Edgerton homesteaded 160 acres and established a ranch. The village grew around his ranch and was called Edgerton after him. In 1881, the VC Lewis Hotel was established.

== Village growth ==
Residents were engaged in the lumber industry. Academy School District 20 was organized in 1886 by residents of Douglass, Pine, and Woodmen Valleys over a 36-square-mile (93.2 km^{2}) area in 1874. (Pine and Douglass Valleys are immediately northwest of the Edgerton town site. Students from Woodmen Valley rode horses to school.) Classes were held in houses until 1886 when the Edgerton School opened near the railroad stop for Edgerton. Located on a mesa above the mouth of West Monument Creek, it was the first schoolhouse for the district. It generally taught grades one through six, but sometimes up to grade eight. Two lakes, one of which was called Ice Lake, were built by five pioneers in the mid-1880s. Their business was the Cascade Ice Company. During the winter, they harvested blocks of ice from the lakes and sold the ice to keep food cool, before there was refrigeration. The ice was loaded onto insulated railroad cars to be transported for sale elsewhere. There are ruins of the dams used to create the lakes, but there is no evidence of the original "ice lakes". The town also had a general store.

The town's residents were upset after the Kearney Ranch murders of Mrs. Kearney and her six-year-old grandson, James Hand, in 1886. Their bodies were found after they had been brutally murdered and signs that a meal that was about to be served. There were three place settings, but the identity of the additional person was not known, but believed to be the murderer and someone known to the family.

There were 50 residents of the settlement in 1890 and 350 people living there by 1902. Many of the residents suffered from tuberculosis, and they came to the area seeking treatment.

== Transition ==
The hotel closed when the new and faster means of transportation meant few customers. It became a farm and ranch house, and then the property was leased as pasture land, and the building burned down in 1941. The Edgerton post office closed on August 28, 1902, and it was moved to Pikeview. The Edgerton School closed in 1915 with the opening of the Woodmen Valley School, which was the only school in the district until 1957. When the highway, now Interstate 25, was built in the 1920s, there were even fewer visitors and it eventually ceased to exist as a village.

The school site is now part of the Air Force Academy near the South Gate. It is along the Santa Fe Regional Trail that connects to the Pikes Peak Greenway at the Ice Lake trailhead.

== See also ==
- Colorado Springs, CO Metropolitan Statistical Area
- Front Range Urban Corridor
- List of ghost towns in Colorado
- List of populated places in Colorado
- List of post offices in Colorado
