= Pikes Peak International Raceway =

Motorsport track in the United States

- D-Shaped Oval (1997–2026)
- Location: 16650 Midway Ranch Road, Fountain, Colorado, 80817
- Coordinates: 38°35′29.85″N 104°40′34.39″W
- Capacity: Grandstands: 10,000; Facility max: 40,000
- Owner: Pikes Peak International Raceway, LLC (2008–present); International Speedway Corporation (2005–2008)
- Opened: Opening: 31 May 1997; 29 years ago Re-opened: 2008; 18 years ago
- Closed: Shutdown: August 2005; 21 years ago Closing Date: October 18, 2026; 27 days' time
- Construction cost: $50 million
- Major events: IndyCar Series; Honda Indy 225 (1997–2005); NASCAR Busch Series; ITT Industries & Goulds Pumps Salute to the Troops 250 (1998–2005); NASCAR West Series (1997–1999, 2005); NASCAR Midwest Series (1998–2005); NASCAR Southwest Series (2000–2002, 2005); Infiniti Pro Series (2003–2005); Star Mazda Championship (2005); NASCAR Craftsman Truck Series (1998–2002); Ferrari Challenge North America (1998, 2000); Trans-Am Series (1997–1999); SpeedVision World Challenge (1997–1999); ARCA Bondo/Mar-Hyde Series (1998); ASA National Tour (1998); IMSA GT Championship (1997)

D-Shaped Oval (1997–2026)
- Surface: Asphalt
- Length: 1.006 mi (1.619 km)
- Turns: 4
- Banking: 10°
- Race lap record: 0:20.7067 ( (Brazil) Tony Kanaan, Dallara IR-03, 2003, IndyCar)

Road Course (1997–2026)
- Surface: Asphalt
- Length: 1.289 mi (2.074 km)
- Turns: 9
- Race lap record: 0:49.238 ( (Italy) Andrea Montermini, Ferrari 333 SP, 1997, WSC)

Short Oval (1997–2026)
- Surface: Asphalt
- Length: 0.250 mi (0.402 km)
- Turns: 4

Pikes Peak International Raceway (PPIR) is a semi-inactive racetrack in the Colorado Springs area within the city limits of Fountain, Colorado. The speedway hosted races in several series including the Indy Racing League and two NASCAR series (Busch and Truck) until operations were suspended from August 2005. A wide variety of amateur racing groups use PPIR for racing and training as the circuit is now closed to sanctioned professional auto racing due to the purchase of the track by PPIR LLC from NASCAR/ISC in 2008 after the track was put up for sale in 2006. The sale included a clause that prohibited sanctioned professional auto racing, as well as the need for additional safety upgrades at a cost of $1 million+ for professional racing series that the new ownership had no interest in implementing with the clause in place. On May 19, 2026, it was announced that the 2026 season was the final year for the track, as the property is planned for mixed-use redevelopment.

By October 12, 1997, it was "the fastest 1-mile paved oval anywhere".

== History ==
Previous logo

Racing in the Pikes Peak Region included 19th century horse tracks (e.g., to the west of Colorado Springs' Palmer House along Fountain Creek by 1882 and to the north by 1903, the "Roswell Racing Park"), and the annual Pikes Peak International Hill Climb started in 1916 on the 1915 Pikes Peak Highway. In 1938, a track was north of the Alexander Aircraft factory and c. World War II another was to the factory's southeast at the south end of the Nichols Field taxiway. On the Pike's Peak Ocean-to-Occan Highway west of the city was the end of the 1951 Colorado sports car rally (terminus at the Crystola Inn), a 1953 dirt dragstrip "some four miles east of Colorado Springs" was used for "the first statewide drag race", and a stock car track was along Powers Road in the early 1960s. The "last local track" for auto racing east of the city through the late 1970s was the Colorado Springs International Speedway which "had crowds in the 3,000-4,000 range on summer weekends". The Platte Avenue go-kart track closed c. 1990, the greyhound track closed c. 2005 and is now an off track betting facility, and the Olympic velodrome in Memorial Park is one of the remaining racing venues within the city.

=== Pikes Peak Meadows ===
Pikes Peak Meadows was a dirt horse racing track facility opened in 1964 20 mi (32 km) south of Colorado Springs and 25 mi (40 km) north of Pueblo, Colorado, with a large, blue, covered grandstand on the west. After its horse racing ended in 1993, C. C. Myers "announced plans in May 1996 to build a major auto racing facility" at Pikes Peak Meadows.

=== Speedway development ===
In 1997, "Apollo Real Estate Advisors LP formed a joint venture January 30 with Raceway Associates, a partnership headed by California contractor and developer C.C. Myers Inc, to own and run the 1,300-acre" speedway complex. The asphalt track was constructed 6 ft (1.8 m) below the "normal ground level", C.C. Myers planned "to get a big-time NASCAR race in 1998", and the facility had an open house for the local community on May 31, 1997. The first race's attendance (June 8) was 16,810, the Richard Petty Driving Experience used PPIR from July 2–17, the first IRL Series race on June 28 was televised, and a NASCAR Winston West 500K race was held in July 1997.

=== International Speedway Corporation ===
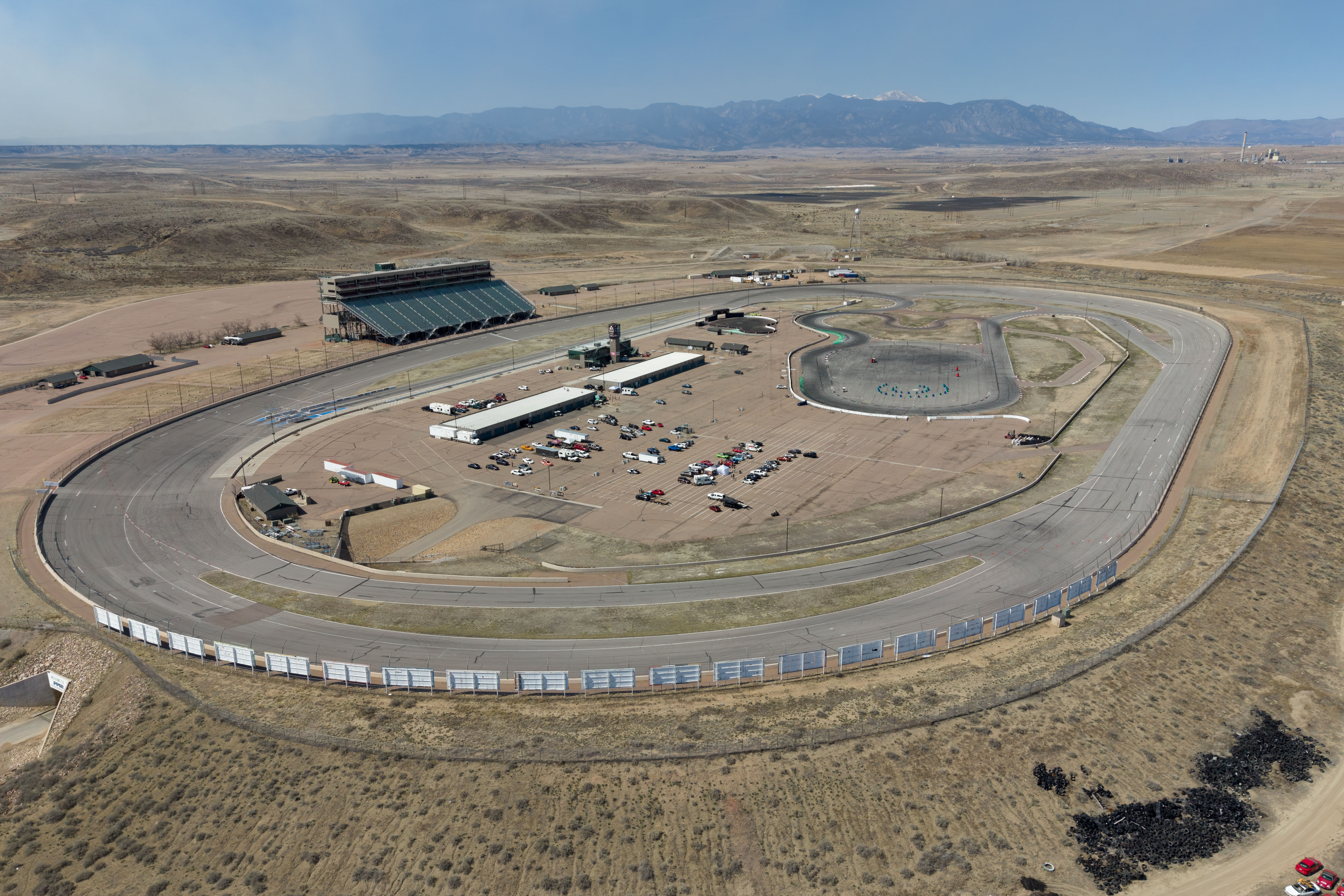
Aerial view of the track

Earlier in 1996, a competing track near Denver in Adams County, Colorado was attempted by Penske Motorsports, Inc. which merged in 1999 with the International Speedway Corporation. In 2002 ISC gained "the right of first refusal should PPIR owners decide to sell their 1,200-acre complex" and in October 2005 for $11 million, "bought out the owners of Pikes Peak International Raceway" (racing operations were suspended and the scoreboard was moved to Texas Motor Speedway.) In 2006, meetings "between attorneys representing [Commerce City, near Denver] and International Speedway Corporation" were conducted before ISC "announced in February [1997] that it was eyeing land in Commerce City as well as eastern Aurora for the track. It envision[ed] a $360 million to $400 million track and stadium that could hold 75,000 to 80,000 fans." A new opposition group, Commerce City Citizens and Business Alliance, endorsed anti-raceway candidates which won local elections, and in May 1997 "ISC executive Wesley Harris said the 1,300-acre parcel the company was considering near Denver International Airport was not compatible with its needs". ISC sold PPIR in November 2006 (the purchase closed in the first quarter of 2007), and PPIR operations resumed in 2008.

=== Series and Races ===
On December 6, 2012, USAC announced that PPIR would be on the 2013 USAC Traxxas Silver Crown Series schedule. Pikes Peak International Raceway would host the richest event in SRL Southwest Tour history as announced on April 23, 2013.

PPIR previously held the largest autocross racing series in the Rocky Mountain Region, PPIR Time Attack. The series consisted of 8-10 races per year on varying courses on the infield of the track. Courses ran from 40 seconds to 1 minute 5 seconds with competitors taking five runs to best their times. The series is based on weight to power and drivetrain classes, including front wheel drive, rear wheel drive, all-wheel drive and a XX class for non-conforming cars or non-street-legal cars.

=== Track closure ===
On May 19, 2026, it was announced that the 2026 racing season was the final year for the track, as the property is planned for mixed-use redevelopment.

== Events ==
Current

PPIR currently hosts a variety of grassroots motorsports events including, SCCA Solo (Autocross), time trials, National Auto Sport Association (NASA) events, as well as local enthusiast events such as track days, drifting, festivals, and car shows.

Former

=== NASCAR Craftsman Truck Series ===
Truck Series Race Winners
Date	Race Name	No.	Driver	Team	Manufacture
May 16, 1998	Tempus Resorts 300K	16	Ron Hornaday Jr.	DEI	Chevrolet
May 16, 1999	NAPA 300K	2	Mike Wallace	Ultra	Ford
May 21, 2000	Grainger.com 200	50	Greg Biffle	Roush Racing	Ford
May 20, 2001	Jelly Belly 200	18	Joe Ruttman	Bobby Hamilton	Dodge
May 19, 2002	Rocky Mountain 200	16	Mike Bliss	Xpress	Chevrolet

=== Indy Racing League ===
IRL Race Winners
Date	Race Name	Driver	Team	Manufacture	Engine
June 29, 1997	Samsonite 200	(United States) Tony Stewart	Menard	G-Force	Oldsmobile
August 29, 1998	Radisson 200	(Sweden) Kenny Bräck	Foyt	Dallara	Oldsmobile
August 29, 1999	Radisson 200	(United States) Greg Ray	Menard	Dallara	Oldsmobile
June 18, 2000	Radisson 200	(United States) Eddie Cheever	Cheever	Dallara	Infiniti
June 17, 2001	Radisson Indy 200	(United States) Buddy Lazier	Hemelgarn	Dallara	Oldsmobile
June 16, 2002	Radisson Indy 225	(Brazil) Gil de Ferran	Penske	Dallara	Chevrolet
June 15, 2003	Honda Indy 225	(Australia) Scott Dixon	Chip Ganassi Racing	G-Force	Toyota
August 22, 2004	Honda Indy 225	(Scotland) Dario Franchitti	Andretti	Dallara	Honda
August 21, 2005	Honda Indy 225	(United Kingdom) Dan Wheldon	Andretti	Dallara	Honda

== Lap records ==
As of September 2015, the fastest official race lap records at Pikes Peak International Raceway are listed as:

Category	Time	Driver	Vehicle	Event
Road Course (1997–2026): 1.289 mi (2.074 km)
WSC	0:49.238	Andrea Montermini	Ferrari 333 SP	1997 Festival of Road Racing
Trans-Am	0:52.575	Tommy Kendall	Ford Mustang Trans-Am	1997 Pikes Peak Trans-Am round
Formula Lites	0:54.570	Vinicius Papareli	Crawford FL15	2015 Pikes Peak Formula Lites round
Superbike	0:54.748	Eric Bostrom	Ducati 999R	2004 Pikes Peak AMA Superbike round
Supersport	0:55.458	Jake Zemke	Honda CBR600RR	2005 Pikes Peak AMA Supersport round
Ferrari Challenge	0:58.207	Chris Cox	Ferrari 360 Challenge	2000 Pikes Peak Ferrari Challenge North America round
D-Shaped Oval (1997–2026): 1.006 mi (1.619 km)
IndyCar	0:20.7067	Tony Kanaan	Dallara IR-03	2003 Honda Indy 225
Indy Lights	0:23.9174	Paul Dana	Dallara IPS	2004 Pikes Peak 100
Star Mazda	0:26.187	Graham Rahal	Star Formula Mazda 'Pro'	2005 Pikes Peak Star Mazda round
