= Templeton Gap =

Gap between hills and bluffs in Colorado

- Valley
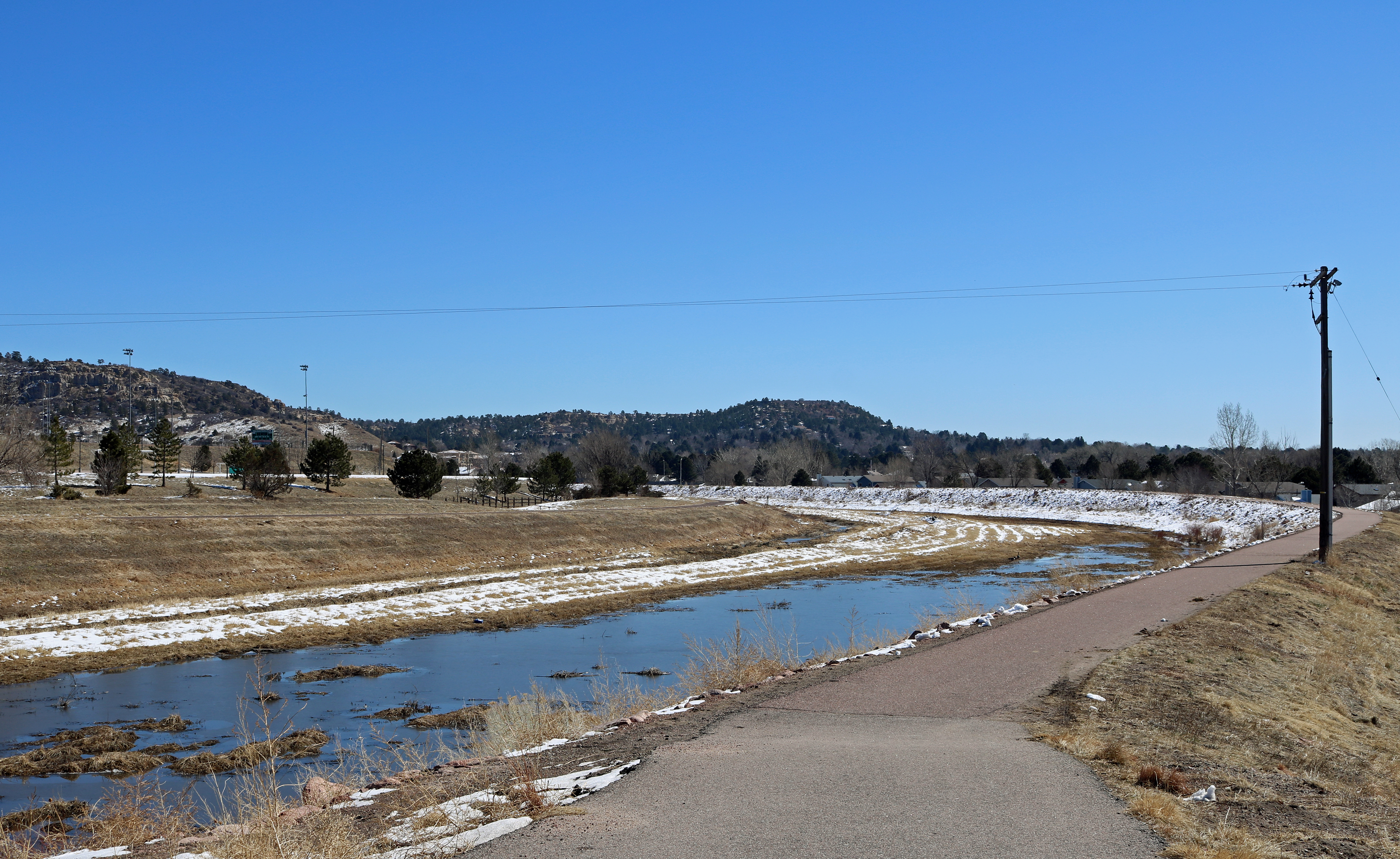
- Templeton Gap Floodway, looking up towards the gap

- Location within Colorado
- Coordinates: 38°53′04″N 104°48′17″W
- Location: Colorado Springs

Templeton Gap is a gap between hills and bluffs located in northeastern Colorado Springs, El Paso County, Colorado. It was used by Native Americans to reach Ute Pass and was an area that oxen trains traveled to reach Colorado Springs. Templeton Ranch was operated by A.J. Templeton, for whom the feature is named.

During heavy rains, water pools in a basin about the city and funnels through the gap and has resulted in devastating floods. The Templeton Gap Floodway was built in 1949 to divert waters and reduce the likelihood of flooding. The city operates a trail named Templeton Gap trail.

== Geography ==
Templeton Gap is a narrow outlet below a semicircular range of rocky hills that is about 800 feet (240 m) higher in elevation than the city of Colorado Springs. It is located between the hills and bluffs north of the intersection of Union Boulevard and Austin Bluffs Parkway.

== History ==
The main trail used by Native Americans to cross into the mountains by Pike's Peak was through Templeton Gap, across Monument Creek, across the Mesa, and then down to and along Fountain Creek to the present Manitou Springs. From there, it joined the original Ute Pass trail.

Templeton Gap is named for A.J. (Jack) Templeton who operated a ranch and helped deliver babies, colts, and calves in Templeton Gap beginning in the 1860s. Templeton signed up to fight against Native Americans at Sand Creek in 1864 (Sand Creek massacre).

It was through this gap that many oxen wagon trains entered into Colorado Springs. A road through Templeton Gap was the most direct route to get lumber from Pinery, now Black Forest.

In the 1860s, it was one of the few locations in the state of Colorado that began to collect and document weather information. Others were Fountain, Colorado City, Golden, and Fort Morgan, Colorado. The project was sponsored by the Smithsonian Institution, and led by Joseph Henry, the first federal meteorologist. In 1871, the observer was A. M. Merriam, who sheared 3,200 sheep the following year. In the 1880s, large herds of sheep were raised in Templeton Gap.

In 1922, there was significant hail and rain that flowed through Templeton Gap and flooded Papeton with four feet of water. It destroyed barns, fences, and roads in Papeton and railroad tracks .5 miles (0.80 km) beyond Papeton. It was estimated to be the worst storm to hit Templeton Gap in 50 years. A more severe flood occurred in July 1932.

The Colorado Springs Country Club was built on Templeton Gap Road on property originally the site of the McKnight Dairy Farm. It was chartered as a member-owned country club in 1954.

== Floodway ==
The Templeton Gap Floodway is a 2 miles (3.2 km) levee to Monument Creek from just east of Union Boulevard in the Pikeview neighborhood. It was built in 1949 by the US Army Corps of Engineers to divert floodwater away from Shooks Run, which flows to Fountain Creek, to Monument Creek. The floodway was seen as a way of mitigating significant floods, such as those in the late 1800s and early 1900s that had done significant damage to the city. It is owned and maintained by the City of Colorado Springs and is designed to carry 13,500 cubic feet of flood water per second.

== Trail ==
The Templeton Gap Trail crosses through 4.42 miles (7.11 km) Templeton Gap, connects with 3 miles (4.8 km) Sinton Trail, and connects to the Pikes Peak Greenway, Palmer Park, the Greencrest trail, Goose Gossage Sports Complex, Portal Park, and the Union Meadows Open Space. The trail begins at a trail head for the Greencrest Trail on the north side of Palmer Park and ends at the Goose Gossage Sports Complex.
