= Papeton, Colorado =

Papeton, Colorado (now Venetian Village)
- Neighborhood
- Etymology: John H. Pape
- Papeton on a map of Colorado
- Coordinates: 38°52′35″N 104°48′07″W
- Country: United States
- State: Colorado
- Municipality: Colorado Springs
- Established: 1901
- Time zone: UTC−7 (MST)
  - Summer (DST): UTC−6 (MDT)
- Area code: 719

Papeton, was a coal mining town, now in the area of Venetian Village, a neighborhood in Colorado Springs, Colorado, that is 1.4 miles (2.3 km) west southwest of Palmer Park. It is located at 6,184 feet (1,885 m) in elevation.

== Mining ==
External images
- Inactive Coal Mine Data and Subsidence Information for El Paso County (map)
- Colorado Springs Central / Cragmor mines (map)

It was a coal mining town, named for Colorado Springs banker and broker John H. Pape, was inhabited by Southern European immigrants, many Italian, who came to Colorado directly after arriving in the United States at the turn of the 20th century. The town was inhabited by individuals who had mined at nearby Curtis, another mining town 1/2 a mile to the north, and moved to the town due to miner's labor issues after they were forcibly removed from their homes by strikebreakers. The 150 men, women and children were led by John Pape. (Note: See Colorado Labor Wars.) The Curtis mine, established by W.W. Curtis in 1899, was a Cragmor area mine.

The plat for the town was filed on May 13, 1901 in which Pape divided up the land for the town into 180 lots. The town—bounded by the present El Paso Street, Templeton Gap Road, and Fillmore Street—had a steel company, power plant, farms, and a large greenhouse. Its street names were after states, like Virginia and Pennsylvania. Plans for a new two-room schoolhouse were made in 1908. A social program was implemented about 1919 by Professor A. P. R. Drucker and his students from Colorado College for immigrants to teach English, civics, history, and math. Wrestling and boxing classes were also taught as part of the program.

Nick Venetucci worked on the family farm in Papeton, where his Italian-born father was a coal-miner. Nick's brother died in an explosion on the farm. In 1942, 200 people lived in the town.

== Templeton Gap Flood ==
On May 27, 1922, a cloudburst flood, the most severe since 1880, (Note: There had been 10 major floods between 1838 and 1914.) occurred along Templeton Gap, a semi-circular basin surrounded by hills, and through Papeton. Papeton's streets were covered by up to 5 feet (1.5 m) of water. Barns, fences, and streets were washed out. Subsequently, there were water development construction projects by the federal government to protect Colorado Springs and Papeton from floods.

== Airstrip ==
An airstrip was built on 320 acres owned by the Colorado Springs Company west of Papeton by Winfield E. Bowersox, who learned to fly and attained his pilot's license in 1913 from the Wright Aviation School. The airstrip was about four blocks from the end of the street car line. (Note: See Colorado Springs and Interurban Railway.) Papeton was adjacent to the Nichols Field in the 1950s.

== Venetian Village ==
In 1954, the Venetian Village subdivision was established between Templeton Gap, Columbine and Hancock Roads (Note: A map based on data from 2003 to 2013 shows that the boundaries now extend east of Templeton Gap Road and west of Hancock, but The Gazette states that its boundaries are Templateton Gap, Columbine, Hancock, and Templateton Gap Roads.) with streets named for flowers, like Primrose and Larkspur. It was designed with two churches and a shopping center. The land was purchased from the Venetucci family, who had operated a farm for 33 years and had a house in Papeton. Property values increased 20.85% between 2016 and 2017, increasing from a median value of $130,645 to $158,730.

== Annexation ==
Among several annexations of what had been Papeton, Papeton Addition of 0.76 acres (0.31 ha) was annexed into Colorado Springs on January 1, 1968. It was one of several small towns—like Ivywild, Pikeview and Roswell—to become part of Colorado Springs.
