= Nichols Field (Colorado) =

Airport in Colorado, United States

Coordinates: 38°53′N 104°49′W

Nichols Field, also known as Alexander Airport, was an airfield 3 mi (4.8 km) north of the city of Colorado Springs, Colorado, between the Pikeview railroad station, and the Papeton and Roswell neighborhoods.

== Airfield ==
An airstrip was built on 320 acres east of Papeton, CO, around 1920. The land was owned by the Colorado Springs Company, and the airstrip was built by Winfield E. Bowersox, who learned to fly and attained his pilot's license in 1913 from the Wright Aviation School. The airstrip and a few buildings was about four blocks from the end of the street car line, between Papeton and Hwy 85/87 (now Nevada).[15][c]s. The Alexander Film Company moved their aircraft manufacturing plant from Denver to Colorado Springs in 1931, just off Nevada Ave between Peakview and Roswell, CO. The field became known as Nichols Field or Alexander Field, by May 1926. A building was labeled "Pan American Airways". The city's first air-mail service began at Nichols Field in 1927.

== Alexander Airport ==
Alexander Aircraft Company moved their aircraft manufacturing facilities from Denver to Colorado Springs, where they would build larger facilities to build their biplanes for civilian use. In 1931, the Department of Commerce described the airport to be on 260 acres (110 ha) with an oiled 4,200 ft (1,300 m) runway on a minor slope. There were airplane servicing facilities and two hangars at the airport. There was a mine and windmill north of the airport, and a water tower with an obstruction light to the west.

In 1928 the Pikes Peak Flying school began at the airport, and was sold by Henry Chase Stone the following year. In 1929, Pikes Peak Air Commerce, Inc. operated what Ralph N. Miller described as "possibly the highest flying school in America today" at Alexander Airport. Planes flying in and out of the airport at 6,200 feet (1,900 m) in altitude, Miller stated, were 80% as efficient as planes and have harder landings than planes operating at sea level because of the thinner mountain air. This can make for a more careful, conservative pilot.

A group of Boy Scouts formed the unique Eaglerock Glider troop in January 1930 to build and fly a glider at the Alexander Airport. Beginning in June 1930, 20 troop members took turns flying the Alexander glider, with more than 300 flights by December 1931.

== Aircraft Mechanics ==
In 1937, Aircraft Mechanics, Incorporated (AMI), founded by former employees of Alexander Aircraft Company, bought the airfield and manufacturing plant. They restored and repaired airplanes, including Alexander Eaglerocks, and during World War II, build exhaust manifolds and engine mounts. They then built seats for aircraft, including Air Force aircraft ejection seats and crew seats for commercial aircraft and the Space Shuttle.

== Nichols Field ==
By 1946, the airstrip was called Nichols Field, where Pikes Peak Air Commerce, Inc. continued to do business. Two crossing runways were added by 1947. By 1961, the former airfield was covered with structures.
