= Nick Venetucci =

- Born: Dominico T. Venetucci; July 23, 1911; Papetown, Colorado, US
- Died: September 7, 2004 (aged 93)
- Occupations: Rancher and farmer
- Known for: Annual giveaways of thousands of free pumpkins to area youth

Dominico T. "Nick" Venetucci (1911–2004) was rancher and farmer in Colorado Springs, Colorado. Venetucci, also known as "The Pumpkin Man" for his annual giveaways of thousands of free pumpkins to area youth, gained national recognition in a 1985 article in Reader's Digest magazine. Venetucci served between 30,000 and 50,000 young people a year with his annual philanthropy and is estimated to have donated over a million pumpkins to Colorado children over the course of his life.

== Biography ==
=== Early years ===
Dominico Venetucci, known to his friends as "Nick," was born July 23, 1911, in the community of Papetown, near Colorado Springs, Colorado. He was one of seven children of Nicholas and Marguerita Venetucci, immigrants from Italy. His father worked as a coal miner, with the family slowly saving enough money to purchase a small farm in 1936.

Venetucci worked for his family orchard and was a caddy at the Patty Jewett and Broadmoor golf courses.

In 1933, at the age of 22, Venetucci began a baseball career in the New York Yankees organization. As a catcher he was moved from Class D to Class A in the minor leagues. Venetucci's career was interrupted when his family bought the farm in Security, Colorado, and Venetucci went home to work on the family farm.

In 1942, 800 acres (3.2 km^{2}) of the Venetucci farm were sold to the U.S. Army for $10 an acre to assist in the establishment of Camp Carson. Only 210 acres (0.85 km^{2}) were left in the family's hands after the sale.

Venetucci married his wife, Bambi, in 1984, following a courtship of 27 years.

=== "The Pumpkin Man" ===
The Venetucci pumpkin giveaways began in the 1950s. One day, Venetucci recalled, he was driving with a load of pumpkins and he just began stopping and giving away pumpkins to every child he saw. Later, children began stopping by his patch and receiving a free pumpkin on the site and a tradition was born. In all it is reckoned that more than 1 million pumpkins were given away by the Venetucci farm over half a century of Halloweens.

Over the years, Venetucci won many awards at the Colorado State Fair for his farm products.

In 1950s Venetucci became known as "The Pumpkin Man" as he received national recognition for his benevolence. "The Pumpkin Man's" fame went national in 1985 with an article in Reader's Digest. He was also a subject of Charles Kuralt's 1985 book, On the Road with Charles Kuralt.

Venetucci's annual pumpkin giveaways started two weeks before Halloween. Teachers from area schools arranged pumpkin-gathering field trips to the Venetucci farm, with between 30,000 and 50,000 children participating in a typical year. Venetucci was on hand for the festivities until his final years, aided in the task by 10 to 12 local volunteers each day.

In 2002 there were no pumpkins on the Venetucci farm for the first time in 66 years, as drought conditions kept the 91-year-old Nick Venetucci from planting. "I can't control the weather," Venetucci lamented. "With the drought, there was no way I could grow pumpkins. The ground was so hard I couldn't get a plow in it. It was so hot, even if I had planted, the pumpkins would have burned up."

In 2003, Venetucci and his wife Bambi contacted the Pikes Peak Community Foundation and arranged for the philanthropic group to take over the farm, leasing it to the organization for 99 years. The foundation began to plant the farm again, growing corn and pumpkins, and relaunching the area's beloved pumpkin giveaway. Venetucci Farm was also granted a special conservation easement to ensure the survival of the historic property and the pumpkin giveaway into the future.

=== Death and legacy ===
Nick Venetucci died of a stroke on September 7, 2004. He was 93 years old at the time of his death.

Venetucci is memorialized with a statue in Colorado Springs on the site of the local Pioneer Museum. The work is installed in a large flower bed in which pumpkin plants are grown each year. The $100,000 statue was funded by millions of pennies collected for the project by area schoolchildren.

Venetucci is also the namesake of one of the Colorado Springs' elementary schools and is honored by the Bristol Brewing Company with its "Venetucci Pumpkin Ale." There is a Venetucci Boulevard located on the south side of Colorado Springs by the World Arena.

In 2006, the Pikes Peak Community Foundation began hosting the annual "Great Venetucci Pumpkin Festival and 5K Run" on the site of the 200-acre (0.81 km^{2}) Venetucci farm. In 2018 the Pikes Peak Community foundation partnered with Pikes Peak region environmental education provider Catamount Institute to continue Nick's legacy. The Catamount Institute provided hands on outdoor education as part of the school children's visit to the farm.
