= Pikes Peak Greenway =

Trail in Colorado Springs, Colorado U.S.

Coordinates: 38°51′34.56″N 104°49′56.14″W

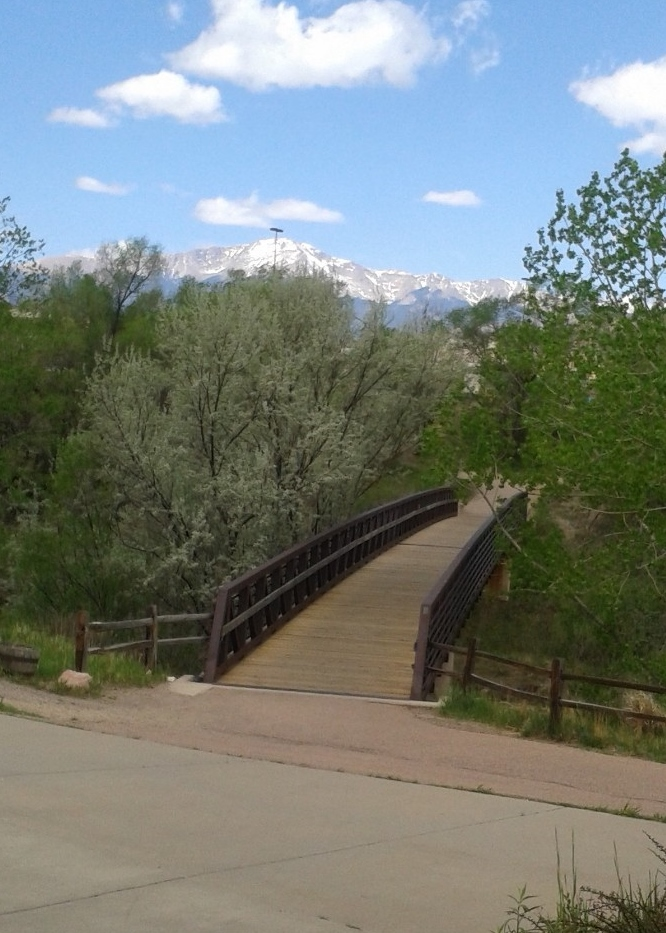
Pikes Peak Greenway Trail - North of Austin Bluffs - Pikes Peak in the background

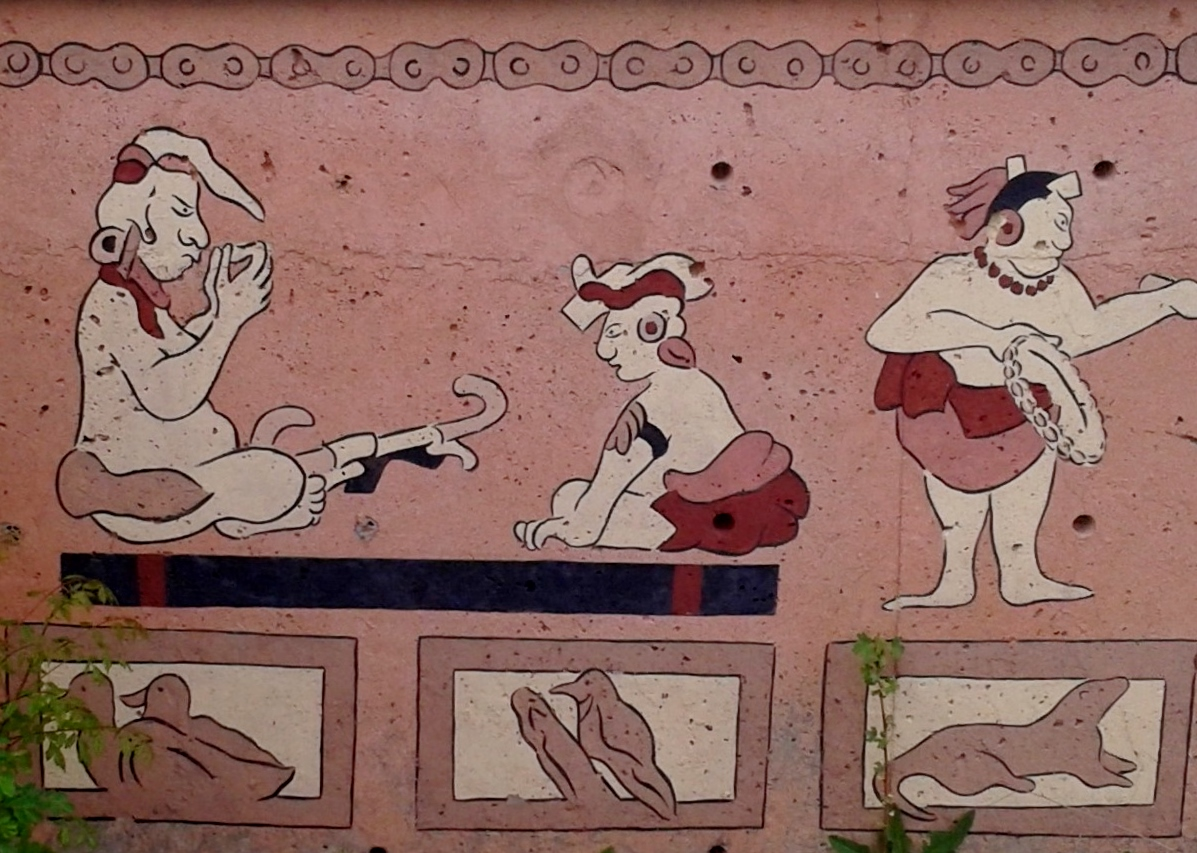
Pikes Peak Greenway Trail - North of Austin Bluffs - Criterium Bike Shop mural

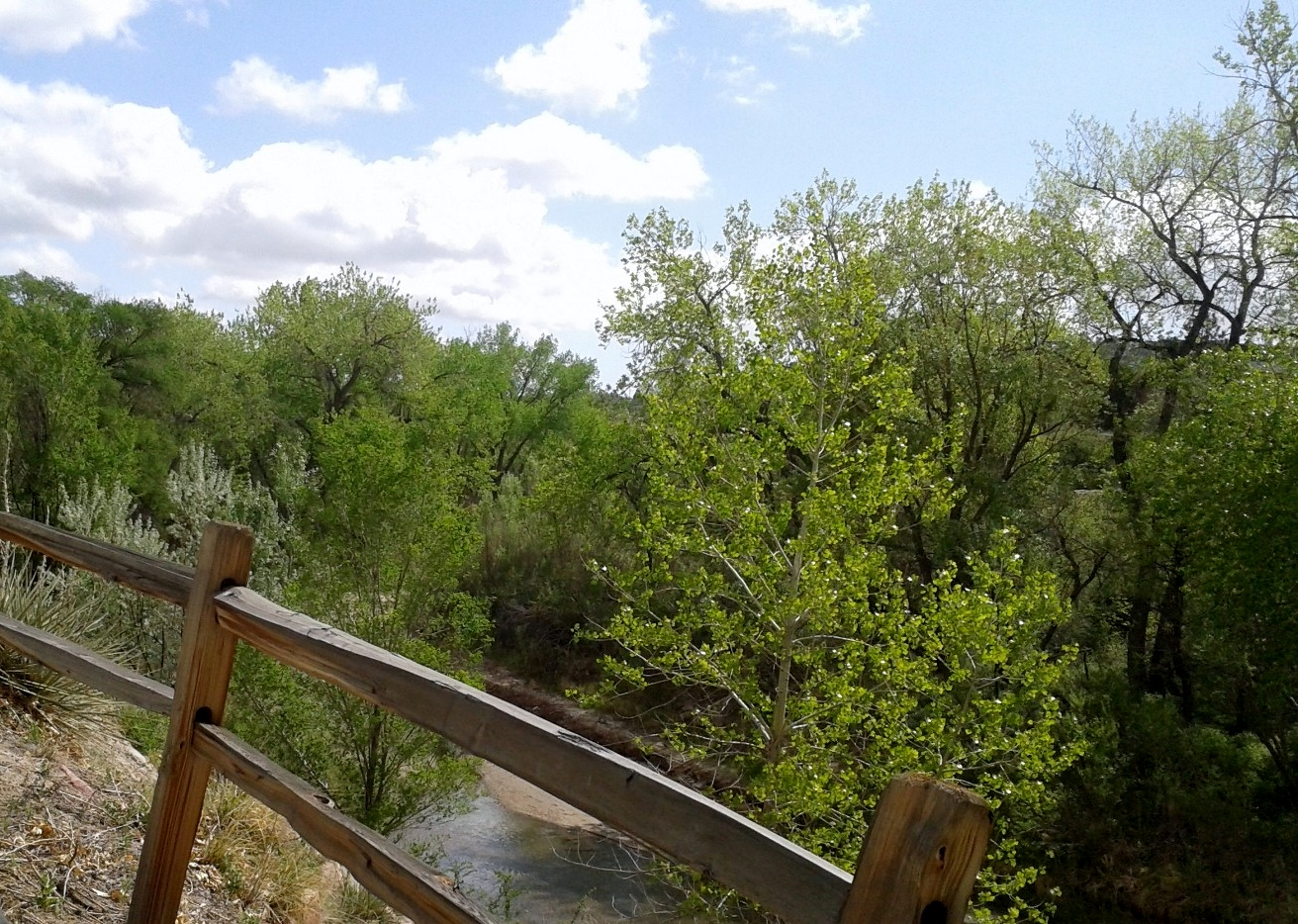
Pikes Peak Greenway Trail - North of Austin Bluffs - Monument Creek

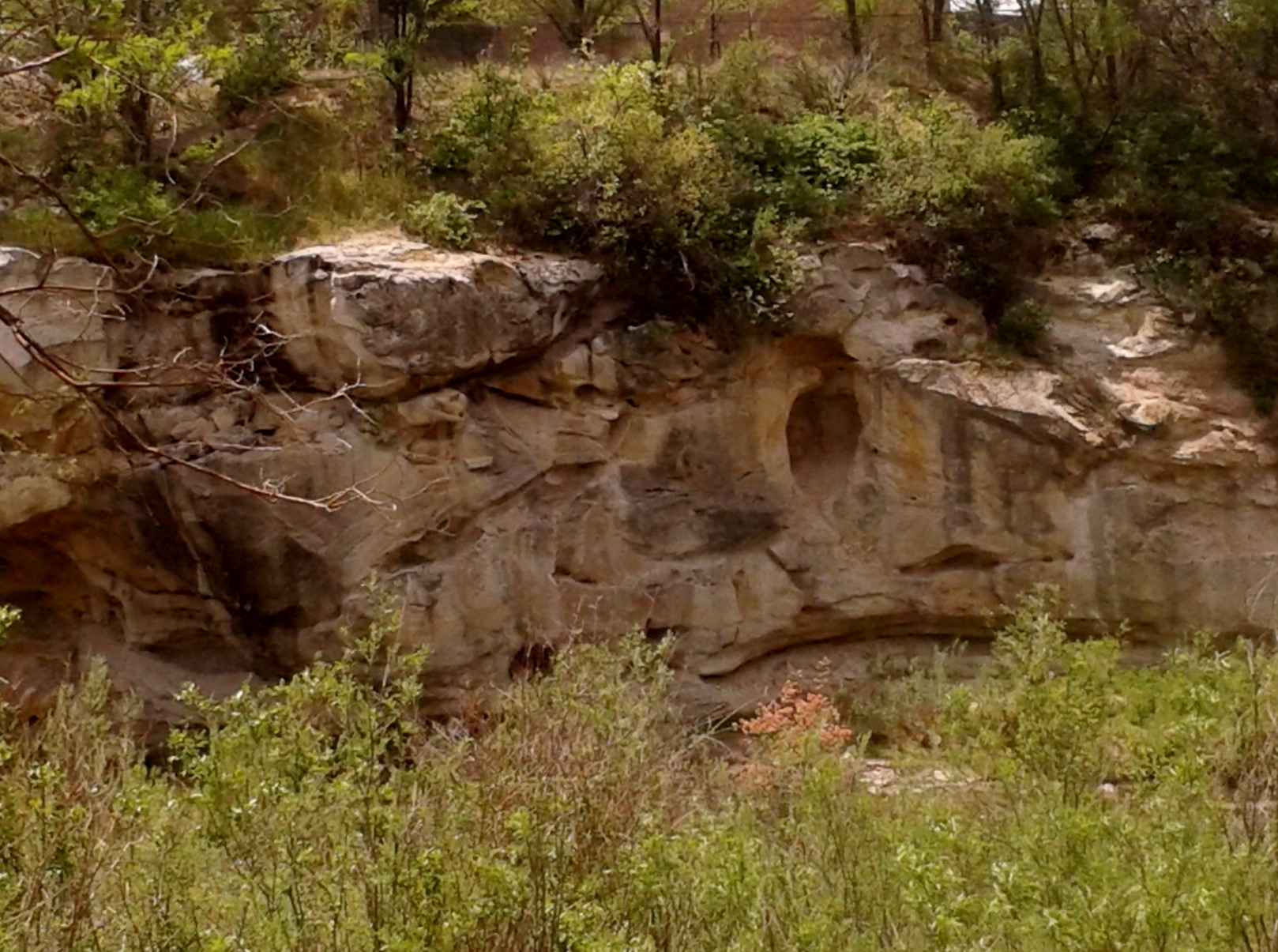
Pikes Peak Greenway Trail - North of Austin Bluffs

Pikes Peak Greenway is a 16-mile (26 km) trail in Colorado Springs, Colorado that parallels Monument and Fountain Creeks and winds through and alongside parks, like Monument Valley Park, and sports complexes. It connects with other trails, such as the Midland Trail, Bear Creek Trail and Templeton Gap Trail.

== Overview ==
Pine Creek Reach, north of Woodman Road, is the northernmost point on the trail and Sand Creek Reach at the El Pomar Youth Sports Complex, south of Circle Drive, is its southernmost point. It is classified as an easy trail; the estimated cycling time is 1.25 hours, without stops. Criterium Bike shop is located along the trail at 6150 Corporate Drive for any needed bike repairs.

== History ==
In the 1980s the concept of a greenway was developed, but it wasn't until 1997 that a Great Outdoors Colorado Trust Fund (GOCO) Legacy Grant was able to provide sufficient funds to get the project started. Trails, Open Space and Parks taxes matched the grant funds. The Palmer Foundation and the City of Colorado Springs also provided funding for the Pikes Peak Greenway. Then, private land that was needed to complete the trail was purchased.

In 2000 the Greenway trail was connected to the New Santa Fe Regional Trail, which allows joggers, bikers, cyclists and skaters to travel past the United States Air Force Academy and up to Palmer Lake. A golden spike was ceremoniously driven into the ground to signify "the opening of a long-sought stretch of trail."

== Trail reaches ==
The points along the trail, from north to south, are:

- Pine Creek Reach — The Woodman Trail is to the west of the Greenway Trail. The northernmost point of the Pine Creek Reach meets up with the New Santa Fe Trail, which goes north to Palmer Lake.
- High Plains Reach
- Northridge Reach (north)
- Northridge Reach (south) — The Austin Bluffs Trail is not directly accessed from the Greenway Trail, but it is a short distance east of the trail on Garden of the Gardens Road and off of Nevada Avenue.
- Reservoir Reach — travels along Skateboard Park and Pikeview Reservoir
- Templeton Gap Reach — passes by the Gossage Youth Sports Complex. The Sinton trail leads to the nearby Sinton Pond Open Space. The Templeton Gap Trail can also be accessed from this portion of the trail.
- Roswell Reach — travels along Roswell Park
- Monument Valley Reach (north) — winds through Monument Valley Park, with trails on both sides of Monument Creek — From the trail on the western side of the creek, one can travel to the Mesa Springs Greenway or the Mesa Valley Trail at Sonderman Park.
- Monument Valley Reach (south) — winds through Monument Valley Park, with trails on both sides of Monument Creek. The Mesa Springs Greenway is accessed from the trail on the western side.
- Downtown Reach — travels through America the Beautiful Park (Confluence Park) where the Midland Trail begins.
- Power Plant Reach — which mid-trail connects to the Bear Creek Trail that leads to the Bear Creek Nature Center
- Tejon Marsh Reach — passes through Dorchester Park
- Spring Creek Reach (north)
- Spring Creek Reach (south)
- Sand Creek Reach — where the El Pomar Sports Center is located and where the trail connects to the Sand Creek Trail.

== See also ==
- Parks in Colorado Springs, Colorado
- List of parks in Colorado Springs, Colorado
