= Monument Valley Park =

United States historic place in Colorado

- U.S. National Register of Historic Places
- Colorado State Register of Historic Properties No. 5EP613
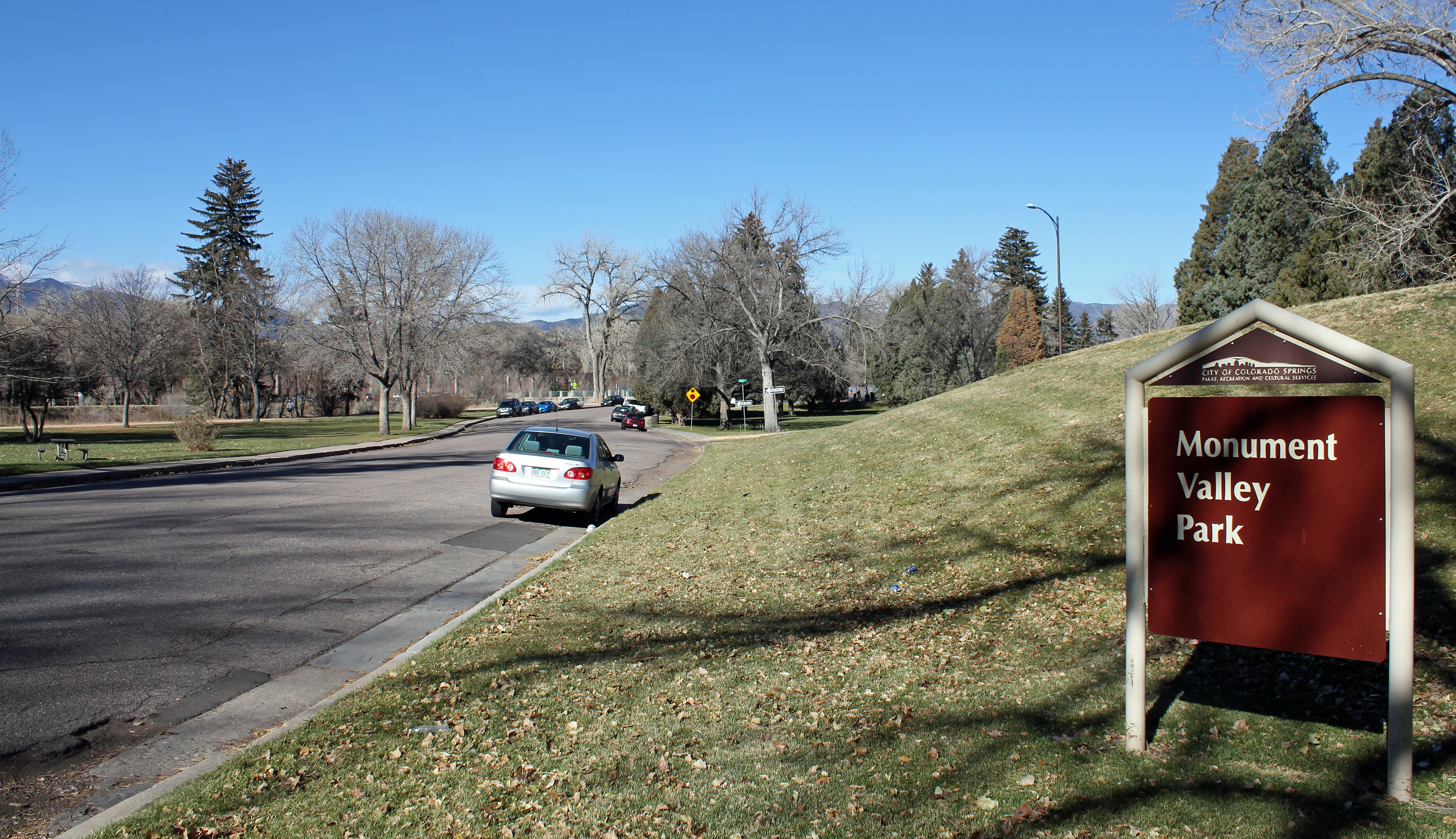

- Location within Colorado Location within the United States
- Location: Approximately bounded by Monroe, Culebra, Westview, and Bijou Sts., the BNSF railway line, and the western edge of the main north/south trail, all north of Del Norte, Colorado Springs, Colorado
- Coordinates: 38°51′11″N 104°49′48″W
- Area: 147.7 acres (59.8 ha)
- Architect: Works Progress Administration; Charles W. Leavitt, Jr; Edmond C. van Diest; MacLauren & Thomas
- Architectural style: Late 19th and Early 20th Century American Movements, WPA Rustic, Rustic
- NRHP reference No.: 06001287
- CSRHP No.: 5EP613

Significant dates
- Added to NRHP: 2007
- Designated CSRHP: 1/25/2007

Monument Valley Park is a historic, recreational park in Colorado Springs, Colorado through which Monument Creek flows. It is a National Register of Historic Places listing and is on the Colorado State Register of Historic Properties.

== Geography ==
The park is located in the center of Colorado Springs. It is about two miles (3.2 km) long, with Monument Creek, a tributary of Fountain Creek running through the center of the park from West Monroe south to West Bijou. It defines the western edge of the downtown area. The park is bounded on the west by Interstate 25 and the Burlington Northern and Santa Fe Railway. At the east is residential housing.

Monument Creek flows north to south and falls about 72 feet (22 m) in elevation. It is 5,988 feet (1,825 m) in elevation at its lowest point at the southwestern corner of the park; it is 6,060 feet (1,850 m) in elevation at the northern edge of the park, north of Boddington Field. The narrow Mesa Creek intersects with Monument Creek at the northwestern edge of the park.

== History ==
=== Park creation ===
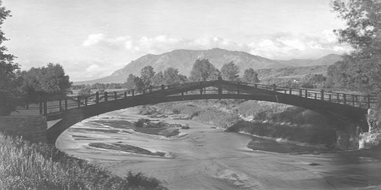
Monument Valley Park Bridge over Monument Creek at Del Norte, 1920

General William Jackson Palmer donated the land for Monument Valley Park to Colorado Springs to be a "park for the people". The park was developed between 1904 and 1907 and included "elegant gardens, winding walks, bridged ponds, a tennis court, playgrounds and an arboretum displaying Colorado tree and shrub species and Palmer's Colorado Wildflower Garden." Every species of wildflower in Colorado was in Palmer's garden. The intention was to create a mixture of formal gardens and natural settings, like natural English gardens.

Palmer was eager to find the mineral springs for which the city had been named, since these had been covered by sands during recent floods; he wished to feature a mineral spring as a gathering place in the park. Palmer found the spring in 1904 and directed engineers to install a concrete vault to maintain the water's purity and a hand pump to bring water to the surface. Palmer announced his intention to build a pavilion and to name the spring after Zebulon Pike's Indian guide, "Rising Moose," who was known as "Tahama" and other names in his native language.

Spencer Penrose donated the swimming pool in 1914.

Years after Palmer's death in 1909 a pavilion was planned in his honor as a memorial. Completed in 1926 the pavilion fulfilled Palmer's wishes to create a public gathering place at the city's original spring and to name the spring "Tahama Spring" after Zebulon Pike's Indian guide.

=== Flood of 1935 ===
The park was damaged following a significant flood on Memorial Day, 1935. Monument Creek overflowed from constant heavy rains over the 30th and 31 May. Within the park, three bridges were lost, the swimming pool filled with mud, trees were uprooted, and meadows and walkways were covered with silt and debris. Shadow Lake was made into a puddle. The streets were filled with water. The 3 natural springs were capped over with silt and debris as a result of the flood. Lakes in the park were washed away and pavilions were destroyed. The bridges alone resulted in damages of US$1,769,000 (equivalent to about $41,541,000 in 2025). As a result, the park today looks very different than it did before the flood.

=== WPA renovation ===
The Works Progress Administration was engaged to renovate the park as the result of the flood damage. They built creekside stone retaining walls, bridges, rock steps and benches using timber and native stone as part of a rustic, picturesque design. A grandstand was built for one of the baseball fields. Stone markers were established with bronze plaques in recognition of the renovation work performed by the WPA. Features that were not replaced include a lake, some of the gardens, and rustic bridges.

=== National Register of Historic Places ===
In 2007, 100 years after General Palmer gifted the park to the city, Monument Valley Park was added to the National Register of Historic Places through the efforts of the Historic Preservation Alliance and the Friends of Monument Valley Park.

== Recreation area ==
The park offers concrete and gravel trails for hiking, biking and walking. It has fields and courts for basketball, tennis, soccer, baseball, and volleyball. The park has the city's first public swimming pool and playgrounds.

The park has two sections, divided by Uintah. The northern portion is north of Uintah and the southern portion is below Uintah.

=== South ===
A recreation area west of Monument Creek includes the South Field, Sand Volleyball area, the Picnic Pavilion, Pool, Playground, and Tennis Courts. There are also tennis courts just south of Uintah. The tennis courts are painted for pickleball.

A pavilion, that accommodates 200 people, is located in the south section of Monument Valley Park, south of Uintah and near the swimming pool. Tennis courts, basketball courts, sand volleyball, a playground and play fields are near the pavilion. Amenities include access to electric outlets, upon request, 2 large grills and restrooms. Keys are needed to unlock the grills and electrical outlets.

The swimming pool is open seven days a week in the summer, starting Memorial Day weekend. It is located at 220 Mesa and has locker rooms. In a large grassy area nearby are picnic tables.

=== North ===
A picnic shelter and play field is located in the middle of the northern part of the park. Boddington Park is at the northernmost section of the park.

== Trails ==
Within the park is a 2.25-mile (3.62 km) North Loop Trail and a two-mile (3.2 km) South Loop Trail, for a combined 4.25 miles (6.84 km). There is also a one-mile (1.6 km) Fitness Course.

=== Pikes Peak Greenway ===
There are two Pikes Peak Greenway "reaches" in Monument Valley Park, one north of Uintah and the other south of Uintah. In both cases there are trails on both sides of Monument Creek.

The western trails have access to other trails. From Monument Valley Reach (north) a traveler can meet up with the Mesa Springs Greenway or the Mesa Valley Trail at Sonderman Park. The Mesa Springs Greenway intersects with the Monument Valley Reach (south).

== Gardens ==
General Palmer's wildflower garden became the site of the Formal Gardens, which contain roses, tulips, zinnias and begonias. It is at the southernmost end of the park near Bijou Street. The City Greenhouse and H.A.S. Demonstration Garden are on Glen Avenue.

== Friends of Monument Valley Park ==
The non-profit Friends of Monument Valley Park organization was formed in 2000 to "advocate for the restoration, protection, and enhancement of the park." Individuals may volunteer to support the organizations efforts. They organized an event to plant trees in the park on Arbor Day in 2009 and 2010.

== Events ==
The Friends of Monument Valley Park organize annual events, including:

- General Palmer Day, held on July 31. It is an event that brings back some of the early 20th century lifestyle. People are encouraged to wear turn-of-the-century attire and bring their own picnic dinner. The evening event, held at the Pavilion, includes a historical program, music, a sing-along and ice cream cart.
- Lilac Day, held in mid-May, as a homage to William Palmer. The day has been celebrated since the parks beginnings. The Friends sponsors lilac planting, starting in 2002, and organized a cleanup day at the park in 2009. In 2012 they planted General Palmers favorite lilacs — the common purple, the common white, the Ludwig spaeth, and Persian lilac — west of the Glen and Cache la Poudre parking lot.
- A Bird Walk was mid-May in 2012 and 2013. In 2012 the event was led by naturalist Ken Pals, and the group spotted 20 species of birds during their walk.
- Musical Mondays began in 2008 and are their main summer event.
