= Palmer Park (Colorado Springs) =

Park in Colorado, United States

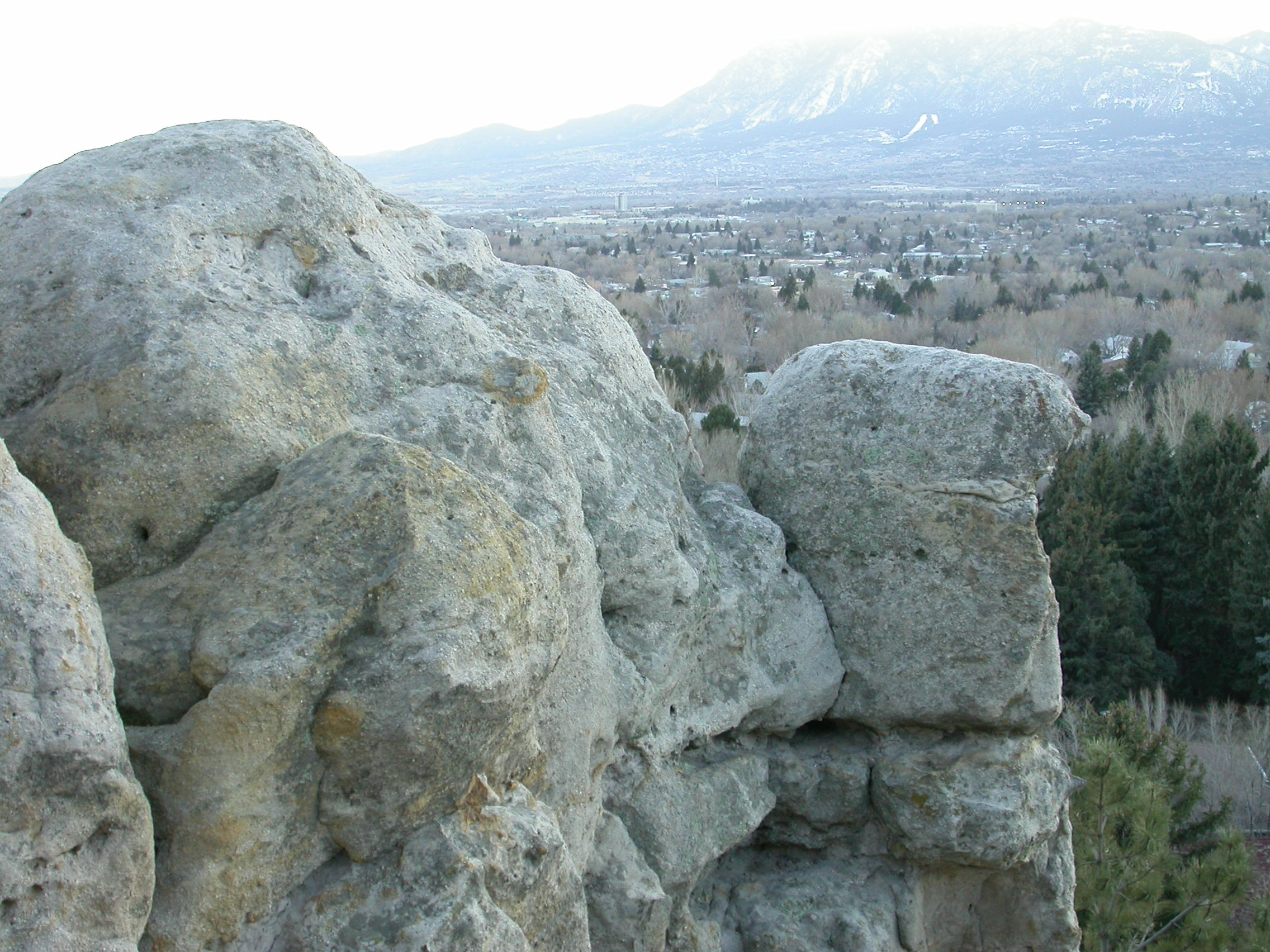
- Looking from the higher elevation of Palmer Park towards downtown Colorado Springs and Cheyenne Mountain

- Location within Colorado
- Location: Colorado Springs, Colorado
- Coordinates: 38°52′56″N 104°46′40″W
- Area: 730.7 acres (295.7 ha)
- Elevation: 6,407 feet (1,953 m)
- Created: 1902 (land donated)
- Operator: City of Colorado Springs

Palmer Park is a regional park in Colorado Springs, Colorado. Located at 3650 Maizeland Road, the park is several miles northeast of the downtown area. Elevation Outdoors Magazine named it Best Urban Park in its Best of Rockies 2017 list. One of Best of the Springs Expert Picks - Sports & Recreation by The Gazette, Seth Boster states that it may have the city's best views of Pikes Peak and a place "where an escape into deep nature is easy. It is strange and marvelous to look out at urban sprawl while perched on some high rock ledge, surrounded by rugged wilderness."

== History ==
The area that is now Palmer Park was once owned by Matt France, the earliest recorded owner. In 1873, France sold his property to Henry Austin who used this property to raise sheep. The general area became known as Austin Bluffs.

In 1902, William Jackson Palmer the founder of Colorado Springs, donated the 692 acres (280 ha) to Colorado Springs for the park. It was one of many parks established due to land donations by Palmer. As reported in The New York Times in 1907, Palmer also provided the land for Monument Valley Park, North Cheyenne Cañon Park, and Dorchester Park. Palmer donated the land for three formal parks in downtown Colorado Springs, including Alamo Square, Acacia Park, and Antlers Park. He improved the roads to the park, Paseo Drive and Palmer Park Boulevard.

The area is now a Colorado Springs Regional Park, and the largest park inside of the metro area.

== Description ==
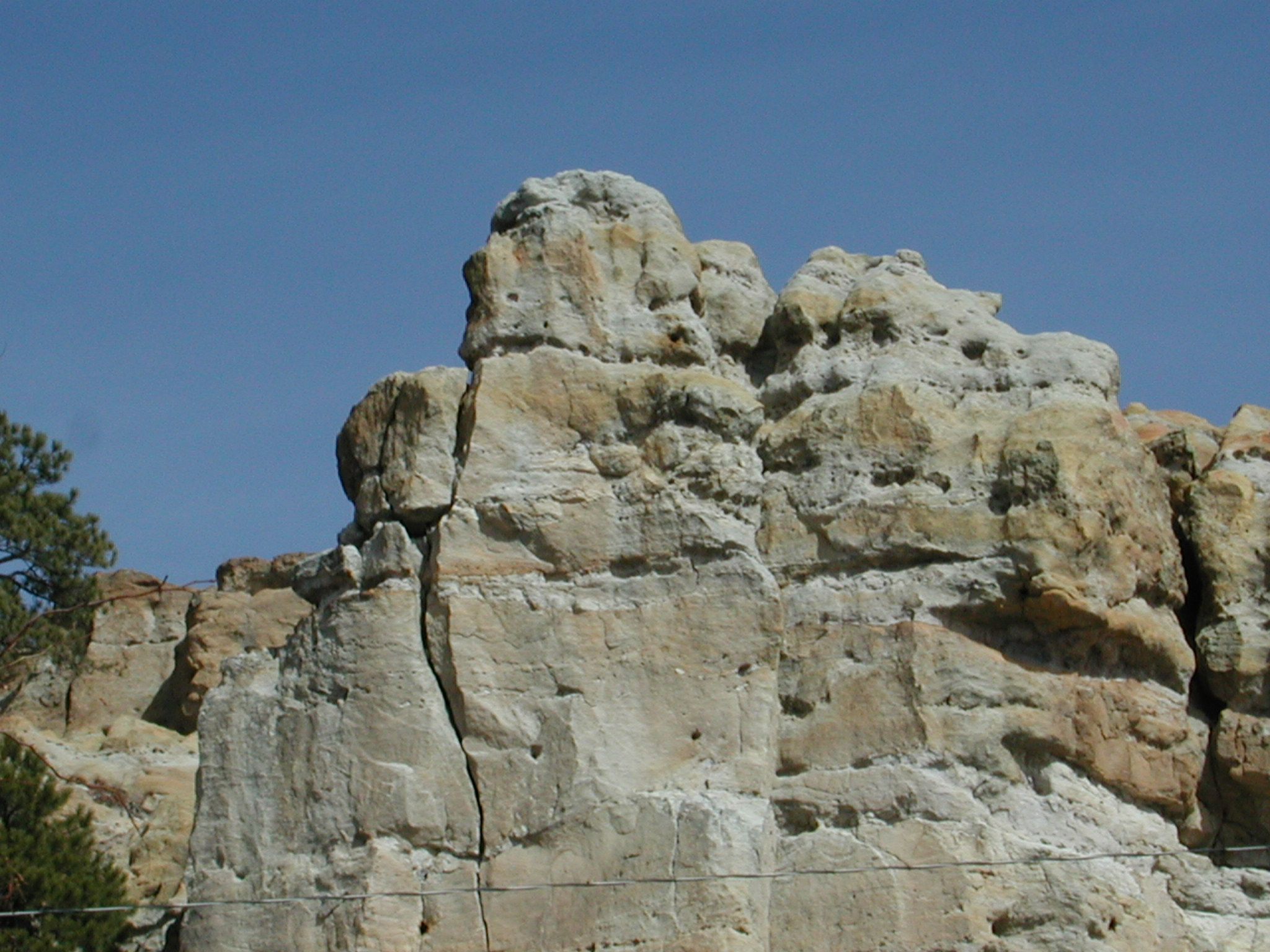
One of the largest sheer sandstone bluff dropoffs, over 80' top to bottom

The park has a variety of geologic formations, including tall rock spires or hoodoos and steep cliffs, as well as open fields. Scenic overlooks include views of Pikes Peak. Within the park is a geological point of interest, Seven Castles, and a botanical reserve for yucca plants. Paseo Drive runs through the park to the horse stables.

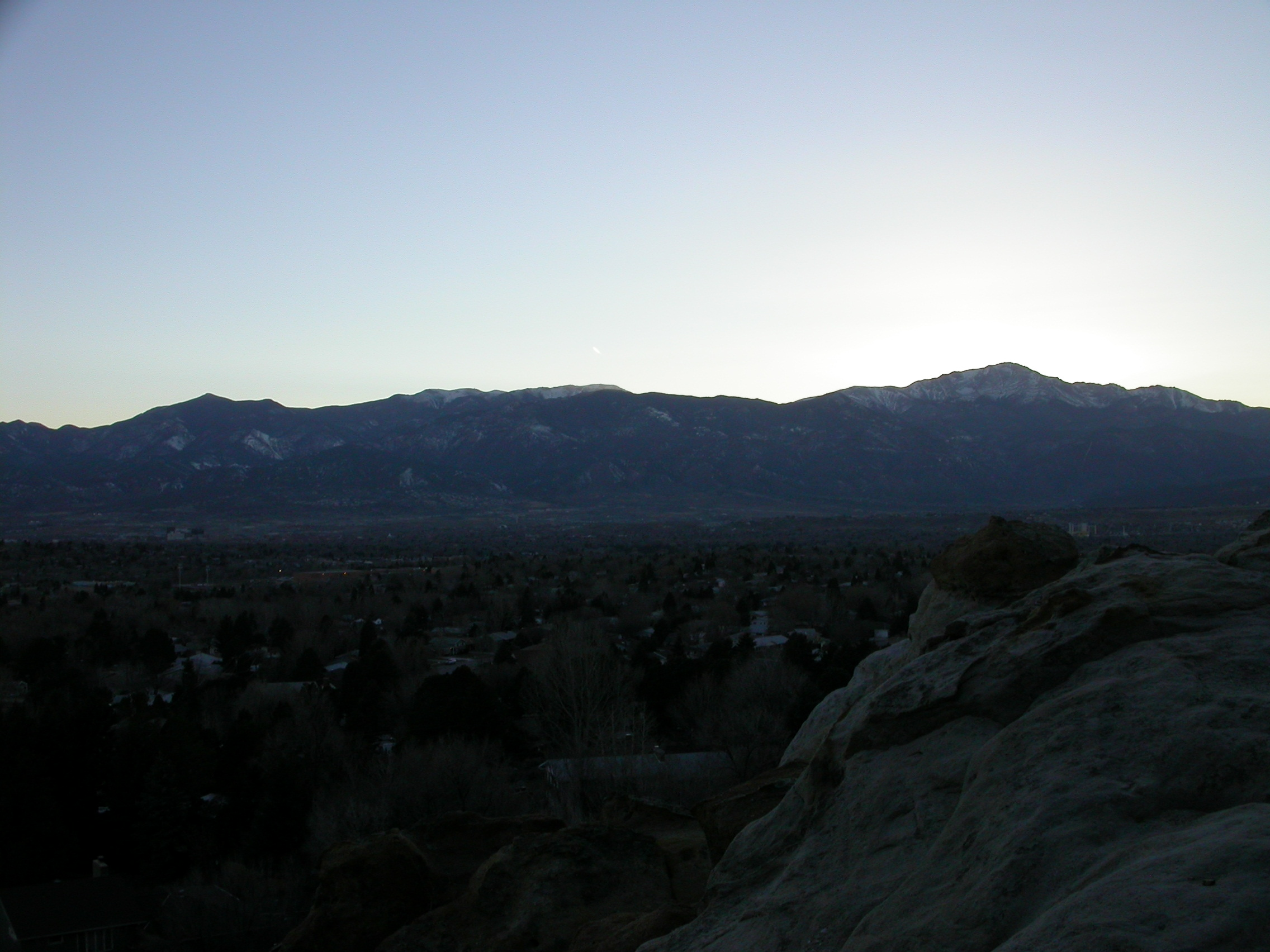
Pikes Peak as seen from Palmer Park at dusk. The high elevation of Palmer Park relative to the city of Colorado Springs provides many long distance vistas

At 730.7 acres (295.7 ha) in size, the park contains over 25 miles (40 km) of trails for horseback riding, mountain biking, and hiking. On the mesa overlooking the city, are interconnected trails are generally single track, but there are also doubletrack trails and dirt road trails. The terrain is rocky and hard-packed dirt. One of the trails is the Edna Mae Bennet Nature trail, a 2.6-mile (4.2 km) trail in the rocky bluffs of the park with views of ravines, canyons, and rock formations. Other noted trails are Templeton Trail and Yucca Flats. There is a dog run, like Bear Creek Dog Park. The park has a dog park, two baseball/softball fields, a football/soccer field, three volleyball courts, a community playground, horse stables, and several picnic grounds.

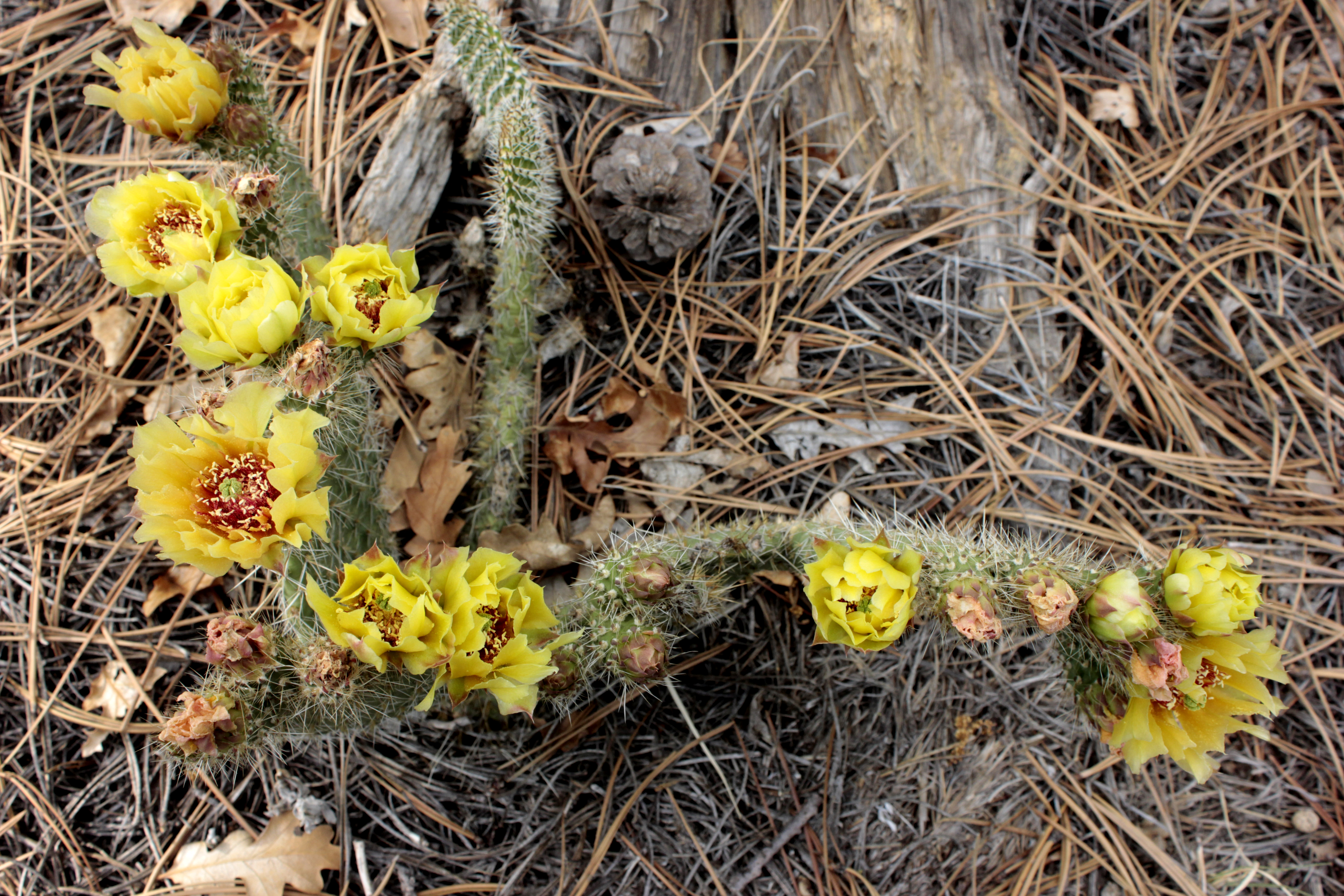
A pricklypear cactus in bloom in Palmer Park.

Flora includes Gambel oak, yucca plants, piñon pine, and Ponderosa pine trees. Rabbits, coyotes, foxes, snakes, mule deer, and occasionally bears reside at the park. A bird-watching park, hawks, ravens, towhees, magpies, pygmy nuthatches, and chickadees can be seen from the trails. Minerals found in the park include topaz, jasper, tourmaline, and quartz.
