= Roswell, Colorado =

Roswell, now annexed into the city of Colorado Springs, Colorado, (Note: Roswell was annexed as part of northern Colorado Springs beginning in 1909. Additional annexations were made through November 1, 1967, for a total of 245.13 acres (99.20 ha).) was a coal mine settlement near the northern bluffs of Colorado Springs and a 19th-century railroad junction. The town was located at roughly the present intersection of Fillmore Street and North Nevada Avenue in Colorado Springs.

== History ==
The town of Roswell, built 2.5 miles (4.0 km) north of Colorado Springs in 1889, was named for a man from New York, Governor Roswell P. Flower, who felt that Colorado Springs' climate was only second to Saranac, New York for its curative benefits for tuberculosis patients. (See Tuberculosis treatment in Colorado Springs).

By 1899, he was an investor in mining and the Manitou and Pike's Peak Railway. The town was located on Monument Creek at the junction of the Denver and Rio Grande Western Railroad (D&RG) and Chicago, Rock Island and Pacific Railroads (CRI&P). The Denver and Rio Grande Western Railroad had reached the area about 1875 and in 1889, Roswell had a Chicago, Rock Island and Pacific Railroad (CRI&P) yard. (Note: The yard was located at milepost 607.3 of the D&RG. There were CRI&P shops in Roswell, a passenger and freight office at 2 E. Pikes Peak Avenue, and the Depot Hotel and CRI&P passenger/freight stations were downtown with the Denver and Rio Grande.) Roswell had a stone Rock Island Round House and an Atchison, Topeka and Santa Fe Railway bridge over the CRI&P railway.

There were 448 residents in 1900. In 1902, Roswell was a "considerable settlement". Its streets included: Brewster, Cable, Elm (a northern city boundary), Holly, Laurel, Low, Myrtle, Parker, Poplar, Rock Island, Roswell, Sage, and part of Cedar. Roswell had a school, Methodist Episcopal Church, and the Roswell Hotel by 1903. That year, the 26.04-acre (10.54 ha) Roswell Park had an equestrian race track (Note: The equestrian race track was a member of the Colorado Springs Driving Park Association in 1898 and in 1903, of the Colorado Springs Racing Association. It was located between Beacon, Cascade, and Fourth.) and a ballpark.

According to the 1910 United States Federal census, there were 426 residents in Roswell (El Paso County precinct 22). By 1911, the population had reduced to 250 people. By 1919, Roswell was a transfer station for coal loads from the Pikeview mine to the north and the Keystone mine 4.5 mi (7.2 km) to the east. (Note: Keystone Mine was located at 38.86806°N 104.78361°W) In the 1940s, the Roswell race track was used as an automobile speedway.
