= Pikeview, Colorado =

Coordinates: 38.9153°N 104.8222°W

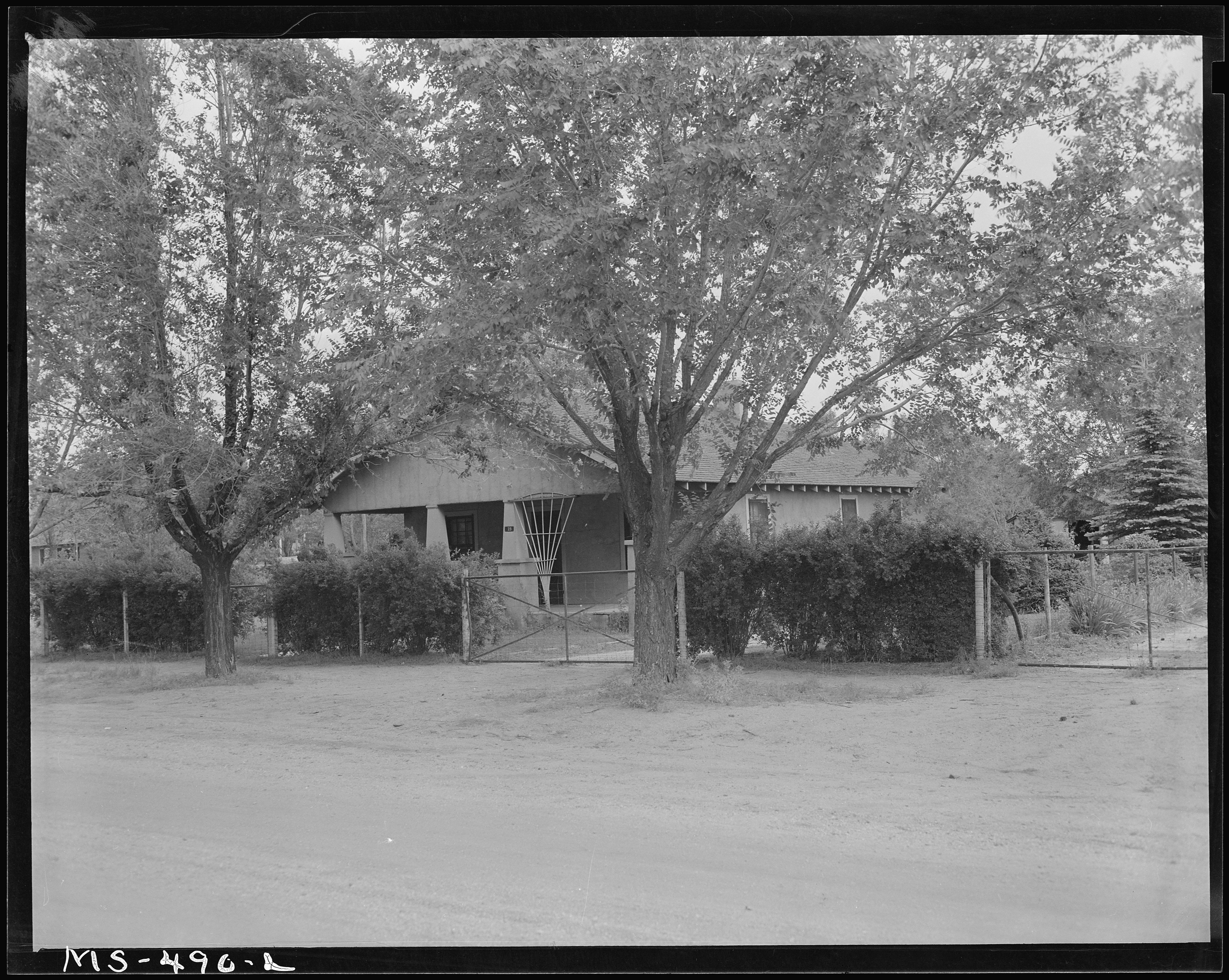
Home of William Morrison, miner, who lives in company housing project. Pikes Peak Fuel Company, Pike View Mine, Colorado Springs, 1946

Pikeview (Pike View, Pike's View) is a neighborhood of Colorado Springs, annexed to the city as the "Pike View Addition" on August 1, 1962. In 1896 there was a Denver and Rio Grande Western Railroad station in Pikeview, and miners had begun digging a shaft for the Pikeview Coal Mine. Pikeview also had a quarry beginning 1905 for the mining of limestone for concrete. Coal mining ended in 1957, but the Pikeview Quarry continues to operate. Quarry operations, though, have created a gash or scar in the landscape and efforts have been made since the late 1980s to reclaim the hillside landscape. The Greg Francis Bighorn Sheep Habitat in what had been Queens Canyon Quarry was founded in 2003 in recognition of the individuals and organizations that have worked to create a nature hillside habitat.

== History ==
The town of Pikeview, which began as a Denver and Rio Grande Western Railroad station by 1896. It was named for the scenic view of Pikes Peak 10 miles (16 km) away. The Denver and Rio Grande Railroad station was situated at a confluence on Monument Creek, north of the Roswell junction and south from the 1875 Husted station.

Two Pike View Reservoirs, which were part of the extension of Colorado Springs Irrigation System to Monument Creek, were constructed in 1894.

A school house was built in Pikeview 1 mi (1.6 km) north of the station by 1903. The Pikes View Coal Mine was the same distance from the station. The post office was 4 mi (6.4 km) south of the station. By 1906, the station included a depot, a pond, and a road intersection of the north-south Monument Valley Highway (now Interstate 25) with a road west to Rampart Range.

== Pikeview Coal Mine ==
External images
- Inactive Coal Mine Data and Subsidence Information for El Paso County (map)
- Rockrimmon / Pikeview (map)
- Pikeview Coal Mine
- Pikeview Mine buildings

A shaft was sunk in late 1896 and the main coal was discovered at what would be the Pikeview Mine, also called the Carlton Mine, on January 1, 1897. The Pikeview Mine is a slope mine, which uses the room-and-pillar method to extract coal. (Note: The Gazette said in 2015 that the Pikeview Coal Mine operated beginning in 1904.)

In the early 1900s, there was a mass exodus of people from Southern Europe. Many immigrants to the United States headed for the mining towns of Colorado—like Pikeview, Papeton, and Franceville—directly after having entered the country. Many of the mine workers were Greek, and when the men went on strike in 1913 a man named Louis Tikas who worked for the United Mine Workers went to the mine to work undercover and take affidavits of workers regarding working conditions. The workers may have been prompted to return to work and await a coordinated union walkout because most of the Pikeview miners returned to work after a few days at the same pay rate.

In a letter dated August 28, 1913, Tikas summarized that there were 350 Greek men working in the Southern Fields, which included Pikeview, Las Animas County and Huerfano County mines. There had been 13 men killed on the job and many more that had been injured since January 1, 1913. Affidavits taken by a Greek-speaking individual was important, otherwise information about the immigrants was often overlooked by government and company reports. They also paid very high prices for goods from the company stores, had seen the scales that weighed coal significantly under-report the mined coal per coal car, did not receive good medical treatment, and were dissuaded from seeing attorneys while in the hospital.

Tikas reported of the Greek mine workers of Southern Colorado,

They are ready at any time unless conditions improve to engage in an industrial war and to fight, just as their fathers and brothers in the fatherland had fought the Turks until their freedom had been obtained, so these men are ready even at the sacrifice of their lives to fight until their industrial freedom had been obtained.

— Louis Tikas, United Mine Workers

Labor conflicts like this immediately precipitated the Colorado Coalfield War, a strike that began in September 1913 and ran for more than year, with a significant escalation of violence in late April 1914 following the Ludlow Massacre, during which Tikas and other Greek strikers were killed by Colorado National Guardsmen and local militia.

The Pikes Peak Consolidated Fuel Company, a subsidiary of Golden Cycle Mining and Reduction Company, was located in Pikeview in 1920. Harvey McGarry of Colorado Springs was the president and Robert O'Neil of Pikeview was the superintendent. In 1922, Pikeview's economy was nearly entirely based upon mining.

The mine was owned by Golden Cycle Mining when it closed operations July 1, 1957. At that time, there were 30 miners who lived in company housing on the site who were affected. Management personnel were transferred to other Golden Cycle operations.

== Pikeview Quarry ==
Pikeview Quarry operated since 1905 and Queens Canyon Quarry has been mined for limestone since 1958. The extraction of the stone by Castle Concrete created a noticeable gash or scar in the Queens Canyon Quarry, north of Garden of the Gods, which closed in 1990.

There is some mining that occurs at Pikeview Quarry, but that effort is being moved to another side of the hill. As the shift occurs, the terrain will cut back the quarry into the mountain, a plan devised by Greg Francis who worked for Castle Concrete for 30 years and spent 15 of those years working on reclamation of the quarried landscape. He started with Pikeview Quarry, about one mile north of Queen's Quarry. After failed reclamation attempts, he devised the plan to cut back the hill so that it can be "resculpted" into a terrain that will better support planted trees and landscaping. "Time and moisture will blend the quarry into the surrounding hillsides," states Colorado Mountain Reclamation Foundation (formed 1992) project manager, Wanda Reaves. By fall of 2003, 2,000 trees had been planted. An additional 800 trees were to be planted on the Pikeview Quarry in 2004. Castle Concrete intended to mine Pikeview Quarry until 2013, so the reclamation efforts were intended to continue throughout that timeframe.

=== Greg Francis Bighorn Sheep Habitat ===
On August 1, 2003, the hillside was renamed Greg Francis Bighorn Sheep Habitat in honor of Francis, who died October 2002. A statue of a bighorn sheep stands on Greg Francis Bighorn Sheep Habitat in recognition of the herd of 65 bighorns (in 2003) and Greg Francis, hundreds of volunteers, and efforts by Castle Concrete to reintroduce Rocky Mountain juniper trees, native grasses, and small piñon to the hills.

== See also ==
- Burgess cabin, nearby on the United States Air Force Academy
- Cragmor Sanatorium, the 19th century tuberculosis sanatorium, was located within what is now the United States Geological Survey's "Pikeview" quadrangle.
- Nichols Field was an air strip near Pikeview

Preceding station	Denver and Rio Grande Western Railroad	Following station
Roswell toward Ogden	Royal Gorge Route	Palmer Lake toward Denver
