= Fountain Creek (Arkansas River tributary) =

River in Colorado, United States of America

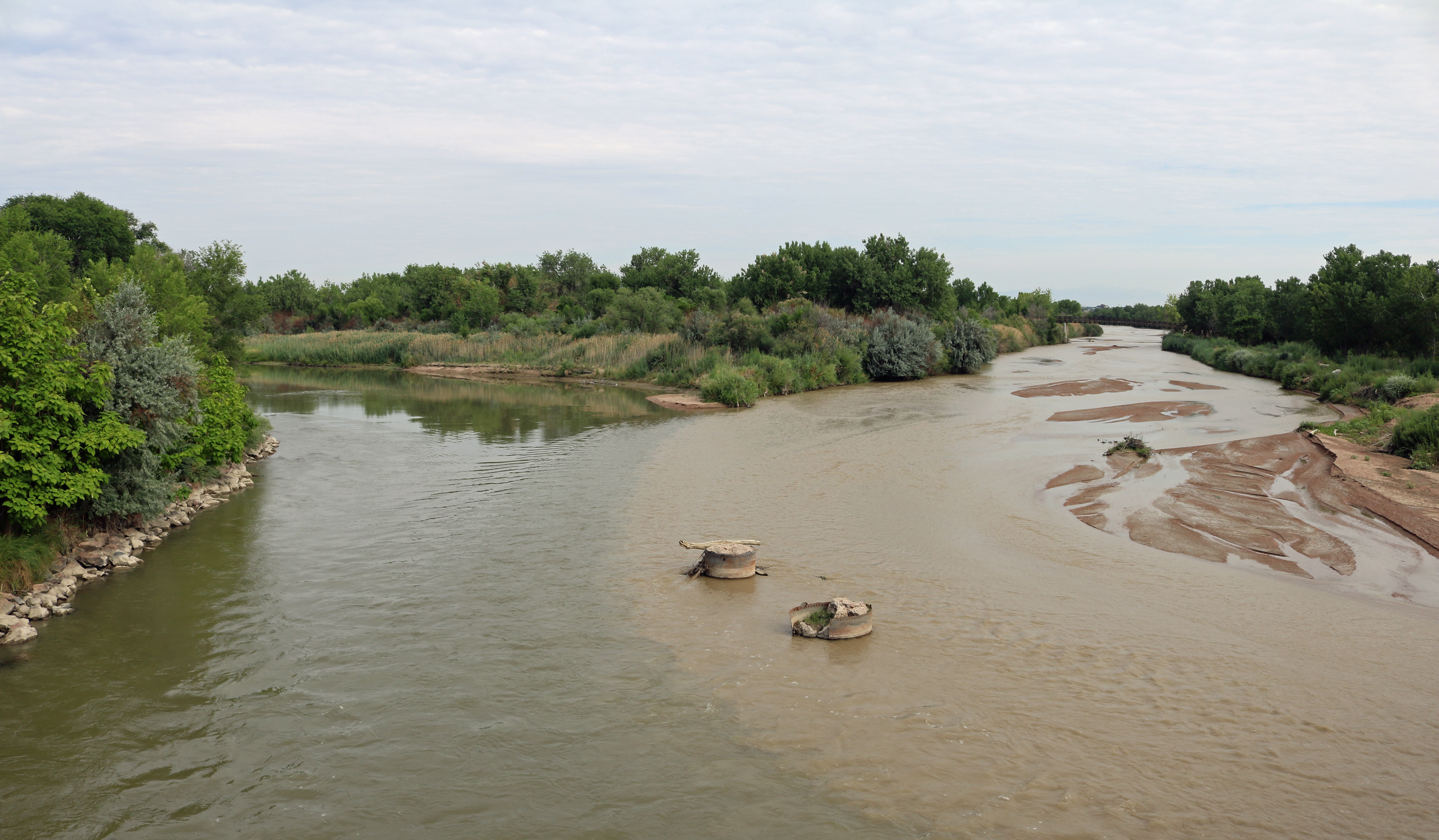
- The confluence of Fountain Creek (right) and the Arkansas River near Pueblo, Colorado.

Physical characteristics
- Source
  - coordinates: 38°59′48″N 105°01′44″W
- Mouth
  - location: Confluence with Arkansas
  - coordinates: 38°15′15″N 104°35′20″W
  - elevation: 4,636 ft (1,413 m)
- Discharge
  - location: Pueblo, CO
  - average: 108 cu/ft. per sec.

Basin features
- Progression: Arkansas—Mississippi

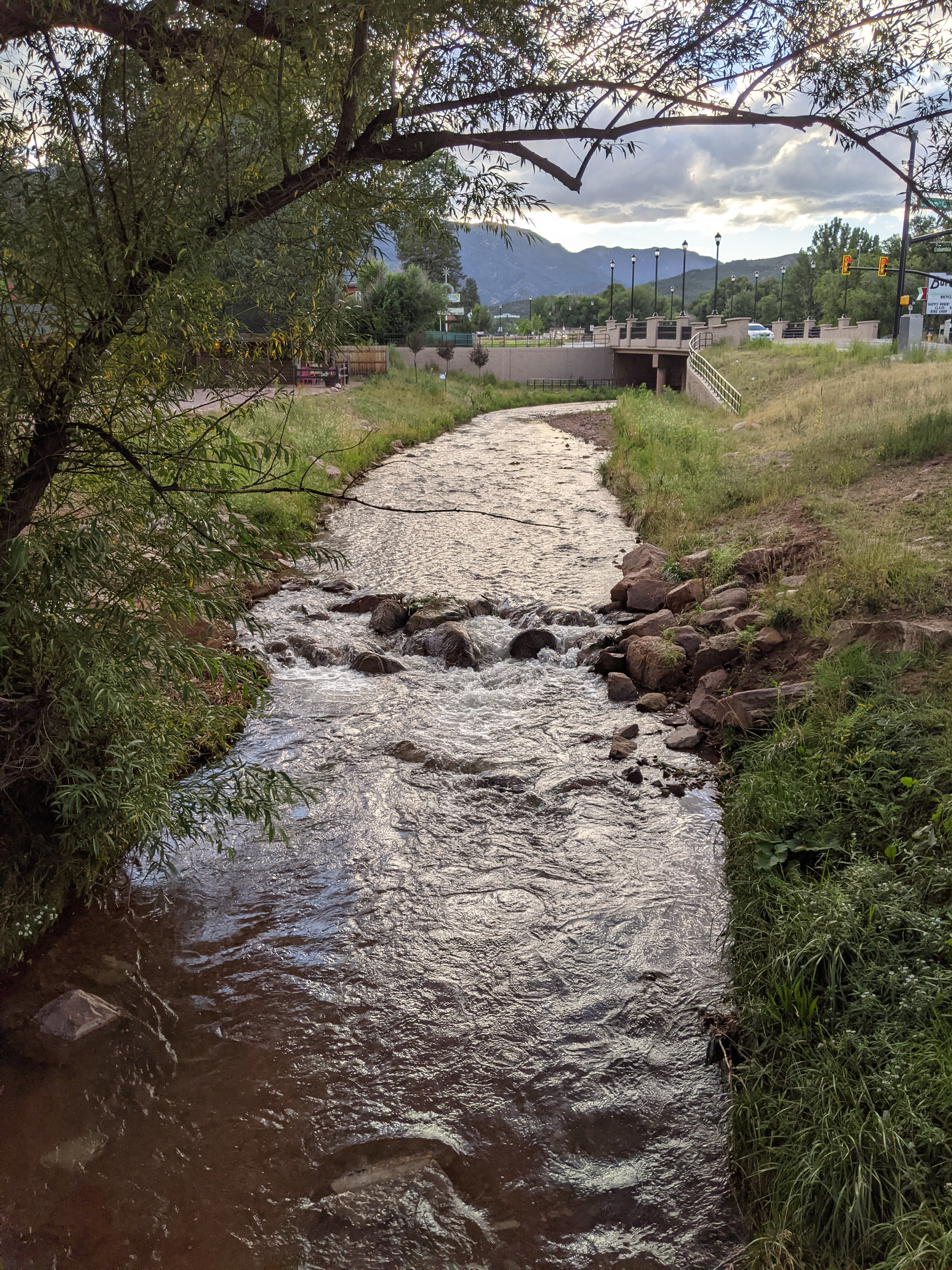
Fountain Creek coming from the box culvert under Manitou Ave, near the border between Manitou Springs and Colorado Springs

Fountain Creek is a creek that originates in Woodland Park in Teller County and flows through El Paso County to its confluence with the Arkansas River near Pueblo in Pueblo County, Colorado. The 74.5-mile-long (119.9 km) creek, once known as the Fontaine qui Bouille, is a tributary of the Arkansas River.

== Geography ==
The Fountain Creek Watershed—located in Teller, El Paso, and Pueblo counties—is 930 square miles (2,400 km^{2}) in area. (Note: The Parks and Recreation Administrative Board states that the watershed area is 962 square miles (2,490 km^{2})) Its borders are Pikes Peak, the Palmer Divide and a minor divide east of Colorado Springs. Monument Creek, which originates on Rampart Range, is the main tributary. Other key tributaries are Sand Creek and Jimmy Camp Creek. (Note: Fountain Creek's tributaries include the following: Crystola, Crystal, and Cascade Creeks between Woodland Park and Manitou Springs. Williams Canyon, Ruxton, Sutherland, and Camp Creeks between Manitou and Colorado Springs. Monument Creek, Bear, Cheyenne, Sand Creeks, and Clover Ditch Drain in Colorado Springs and to Fountain. Jimmy Camp, Little Fountain, Williams Creek, Young Hollow, and Steele Hollow Creeks between Fountain and Pueblo.) Fountain Creek and its tributaries flow through Woodland Park, Green Mountain Falls, Palmer Lake, Monument, Manitou Springs, Colorado Springs, and Pueblo.

Fountain Creek's elevation ranges from 14,115 to 4,640 feet (4,302 to 1,414 m) from Pikes Peak to where it meets the Arkansas River in Pueblo. (Note: The Parks and Recreation Administrative Board states that the high and low elevations are respectively 14,114 and 4,640 feet (4,302 and 1,414 m).) With the significant elevation changes, there are diverse ecosystems and extreme temperature and precipitation variations.

== Recreation areas ==
Within the watershed are regional and local parks, including the Fountain Creek Regional Park and Nature Center in Fountain and the Whitewater Kayak Park in Pueblo, and creekside trails that are used for jogging, hiking, bicycle riding, and viewing wildlife.

A future project is the Fountain Creek Eco-Fit Education Park, which is to be located in Colorado Springs, south of the El Pomar Youth Sports Park on 40 acres donated by the City of Colorado Springs in 2011. Connected to areas along the creek using webcam and other Internet technology, the Fountain Creek Eco-Fit Education Park, will provide a means for visitors to learn about the creek through hands-on and interactive play.

Fly fisherman have begun to work together in 2019 to bring awareness to Fountain Creek. Through their continuous efforts, fishing has been brought forward as a primary recreational activity on Fountain Creek. Note: catch and release fishing due to poor water quality.

== Water quality ==
=== 1999 sewage spill ===
In 1999, 70 million gallons of raw sewage spilled into the creek at Colorado Springs during a flood. Due to a blockage, sewage backed up into houses and wastewater pipes in the sewer system were cracked. "That wiped out our whole wastewater system... We lost about 68 million gallons of wastewater – untreated sewage," said Steve Berry, a spokesman for Colorado Springs Utilities. Between 1988 and 2003, there was a total of 74 million gallons of raw sewage that spilled into Fountain Creek. There were continued sewage spills in 2004. In 2005, there were more than 300,000 gallons of nonpotable water and sewage spills, which resulted in a fine of $130,000 to Colorado Springs Utilities by the Colorado Department of Health. Another 44,000 gallon raw sewage spill into Shooks Run and Fountain Creek on January 5, 2006, producing elevated levels of E. coli in Fountain Creek, resulted in a $10,000 fine for the utility and a required evaluation for how the utility managed sewage blockages within its system. Changes required of the utility to improve the sewage system could cost up to $40 million by 2012. In total, the utility expects to spend $250 million by 2025 to improve its sewer system and prevent sewage spills into Fountain Creek. According to The Gazette in 2007, untreated sewage spills into the creek an average of 10 times every year. Most of the sewage spills occurred before 2006, but there were still spills and penalties through 2011.

The sewage spills polluted the Creek, which was of particular concern to downstream users, like the City of Pueblo. Tests between 2007 and 2009 by the U.S. Geological Survey (USGS) (Note: The U.S. Geological Survey worked with the Colorado State University-Pueblo, Colorado Springs Utilities, Colorado Department of Public Health and Environment, and City of Colorado Springs on water quality studies.) found levels of the E. coli bacterium above the safe limit in Ruxton Creek, Fountain Creek near Green Mountain Falls, and Fountain Creek near 8th Street. The E. coli levels were particularly high in the summer. Using microbial source tracking (MST) and DNA tracking, birds were identified and validated via water quality testing as the source of summer increases in E. coli.

Colorado Springs Utilities, after almost ten years, had its compliance order with the state's Water Quality Control Division closed in 2013. The utility spent more than $170 million on improvements to the sewage system and $450,000 in penalties regarding sewage spills into Fountain Creek and its tributaries. The changes to the wastewater collection system included creation of detention ponds to divert overflow for treatment, a rapid response trailer to manage overflow problems, 80 miles (130 km) of large-diameter pipes, creek crossing projects, and more than 1,200 manhole covers. In 2014, a $145 bonding plan that would have included a regional stormwater project was voted down. It would have created a partnership with El Paso County, Green Mountain Falls, Manitou Springs, and Fountain to implement flood control projects.

=== Selenium concentration ===
Fountain Creek was identified by the State of Colorado as "impaired" due to high levels of selenium, picked up from the soil by ground and surface water, and E. coli in parts of the watershed. E. coli exceeds safe levels due to raw sewage spills, wildlife, livestock, stormwater overflows, and farm and ranch runoff. The variability of water flow, such as through floods, sewage spills, and groundwater runoff, have made the creek subject to sediment build-up, changes in flow, and vegetation changes.

The Fountain Creek Vision Task Force was created in 2006 by the Pueblo and El Paso county commissioners to address water quality issues and promote recreation along the creek. The task force focuses on improving water quality for aquatic species and public health, ensuring a healthy wildlife habitat, resolving stormwater overflows, and investigating land use impacts. It recommended the creation of the Fountain Creek Watershed Drainage, Flood Control, and Greenway District for long-term management, leadership, and funding.

== Management ==
Fountain Creek Watershed Drainage, Flood Control, and Greenway District was created on April 30, 2009, under Senate Bill 09-141. Overseen by nine board members, the "District's primary goals are to create healthy and safe waterways and establish greater recreation and appreciation opportunities, all through regional collaboration." Its projects include wetland restoration, sediment removal, water quality improvements, flood attenuation, erosion management and aquatic and wildlife habitat management. An additional 6.5 miles (10.5 km) trail is to be added at Clear Spring Ranch. The district's goals also include protecting open space.

The district established relationships and partnerships with governmental agencies, organizations, universities, and the Fountain Creek Foundation—whose goals are to encourage and promote environmental and generational stewardship of the Fountain Creek—to meet the District's goals. (Note: The Fountain Creek Watershed Drainage, Flood Control, and Greenway District's partners include the Army Corps of Engineers, Colorado Dept. of Transportation (CDOT), Colorado Division of Wildlife, Colorado Open Lands, Colorado Springs Utilities, Colorado State Parks, Colorado State University – Fort Collins and Pueblo, Colorado Water Conservation Board, Cities of Pueblo and Fountain, El Paso County Parks and Leisure Services, Fountain Creek Foundation (non-profit), Great Outdoors Colorado (GOCO), Lower Ark Valley Water Conservancy District, Natural Resources Conservation Service, Pueblo Historic Eastside Neighborhoods, U.S. Geological Survey.)

== See also ==
- List of rivers of Colorado
