= Monument Creek (Fountain Creek tributary) =

River in Colorado, United States

Coordinates: 38°49′41″N 104°50′01″W

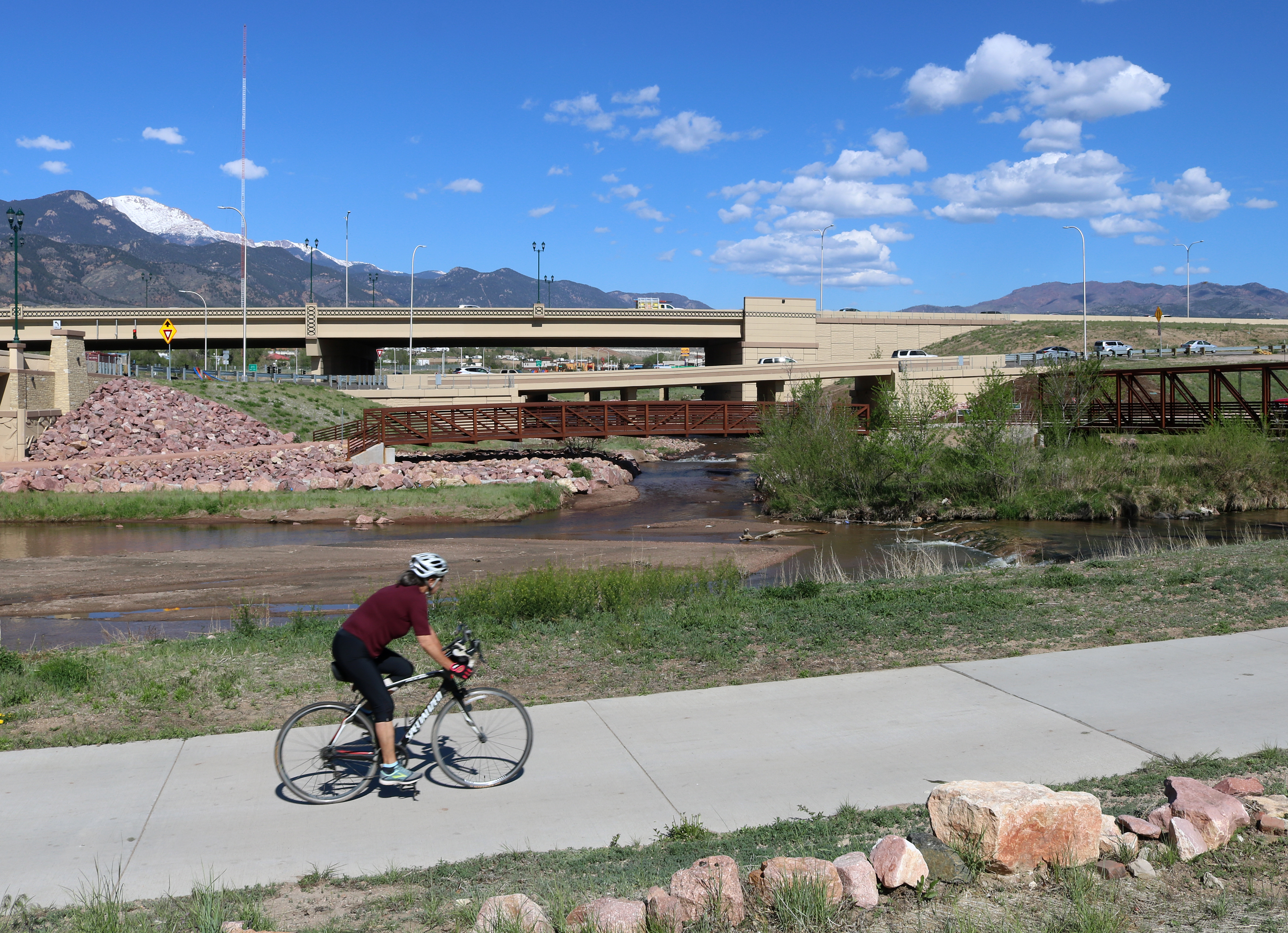
The confluence of Monument Creek (right) with Fountain Creek (center) in Colorado Springs, Colorado.

Monument Creek is an El Paso County, Colorado, stream on the Arkansas River water basin. It flows south from Mount Deception through Pikeview and Monument, and into Colorado Springs, where it meets up with Fountain Creek. It is 27.2 miles (43.8 km) from its northernmost boundary with National Forest Lands to its confluence with Fountain Creek near the intersection of Interstate 25 and U.S. Route 24.

== Monument Creek watershed ==
The Monument Creek watershed is bounded on the north by the Palmer Divide, which divides the Platte River and Arkansas River watersheds. It extends from Black Forest west to Rampart Range.

Monument Creek Sub-watersheds
Sub-watershed	Source	Mouth	Size
North Monument Creek	Mount Deception	Palmer Lake	8,177 hectares (20,210 acres)
Beaver Creek	Monument	Palmer Lake	6,849 hectares (16,920 acres)
Jackson Creek	Monument	Monument	12,986 hectares (32,090 acres)
West Monument Creek	Woodland Park	Pikeview	5,847 hectares (14,450 acres)
Kettle Creek	Black Forest	Pikeview	8,225 hectares (20,320 acres)
Pine Creek	Falcon	Pikeview	3,654 hectares (9,030 acres)
Cottonwood Creek	Falcon	Pikeview	5,716 hectares (14,120 acres)
Douglas Creek	Cascade	Pikeview	5,728 hectares (14,150 acres)
Lower Monument Creek			3,051 hectares (7,540 acres)

== Monument Valley Park ==
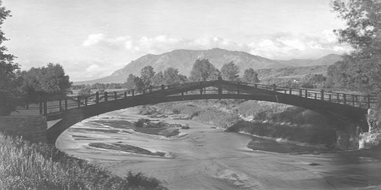
Monument Valley Park Bridge over Monument Creek at Del Norte, 1920

Monument Creek flows through the approximately 2 miles (3.2 km) long Monument Valley Park at the western edge of downtown Colorado Springs. The creek runs through the center of the park from West Monroe south to West Bijou. Within the park, Monument Creek flows north to south and falls about 72 feet (22 m) in elevation. It is 5,988 feet (1,825 m) in elevation at its lowest point at the southwestern corner of the park; It is 6,060 feet (1,850 m) in elevation at the northern edge of the park, north of Boddington Field. The narrow Mesa Creek intersects with Monument Creek at the northwestern edge of the park.

== Flood of 1935 ==
A significant flood of Monument Creek occurred on Memorial Day, 1935 when it overflowed from constant heavy rains over May 30 and 31. Within the Monument Valley Park, three bridges were lost, the swimming pool filled with mud, trees were uprooted, and meadows and walkways were covered with silt and debris. Shadow Lake was made into a puddle. The streets were filled with water. The 3 natural springs were capped over with silt and debris as a result of the flood. Lakes in the park were washed away and pavilions were destroyed. As a result, the park today looks very different than it did before the flood.

The Works Progress Administration (WPA) was engaged to renovate the park as the result of the flood damage. They built creekside stone retaining walls, bridges, rock steps and benches using timber and native stone as part of a rustic, picturesque design. A grandstand was built for one of the baseball fields. Stone markers were established with bronze plaques in recognition of the renovation work performed by the WPA. Features that were not replaced include a lake, some of the gardens, and rustic bridges.

== Water quality mitigation ==
In 2004 and 2006 the creek was declared "impaired" for fish and wildlife due to the presence of selenium from an unknown source. In 2004 it was also said to have been subject to an unknown biologic stressor. Sufficient water quality was attained by May 6, 2008.

== See also ==
- List of rivers of Colorado
