= Pawtoberfest =

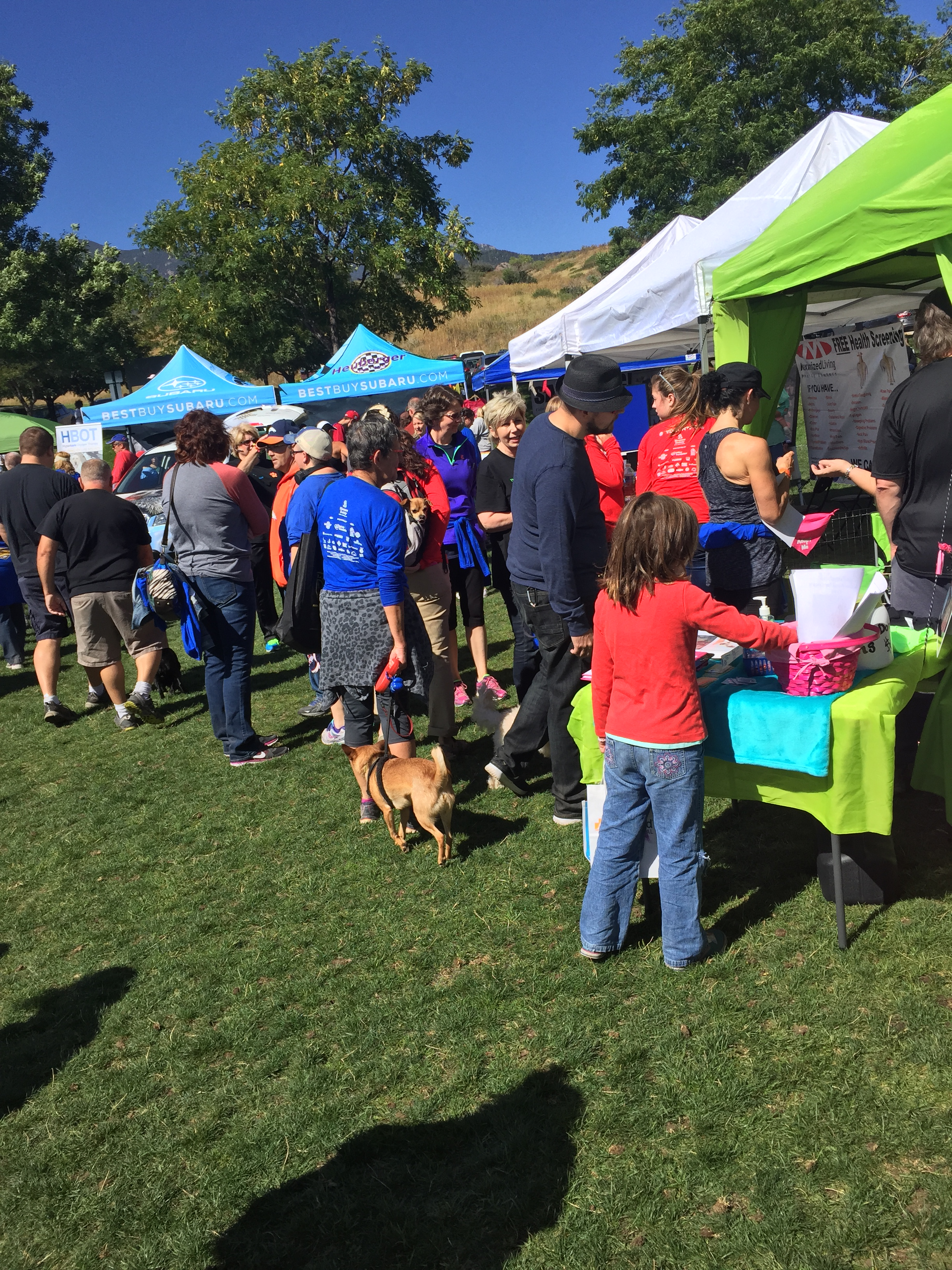
Festival attendees and their dogs take in the scene.

Pawtoberfest is a fundraising event organized by the Humane Society of the Pikes Peak Region. Consisting of outdoor festival, featuring beer and spirits tasting, pet contest, and vendor booths, this event currently takes place in Colorado Springs, Colorado during September at Union Printers Home at Printers Hill.

== History ==
Pawtoberfest was conceived as a promotional event by the HSPPR in an effort to encourage local pet adoption. The first Pawtoberfest in 2009 consisted of the K9-5K (then considered a separate event) on the streets of downtown Colorado Springs, followed by a festival on the porch of the Nosh restaurant. In 2010 and 2011, the event was held at America the Beautiful Park. Although typically an outdoor event, the festival portion of Pawtoberfest was held in the Norris-Penrose Event Center in 2012 due to weather complications. Subsequent races were hosted by Bear Creek Regional Park; however, the event center was utilized for its parking lot. A dog-friendly shuttle service was offered to take participants to the start line, or directly to the festival. In 2024, HSPPR moved the event to Union Printers Home at Printers Hill, and removed the 5k aspect from the event, focusing on the event on being a festival.

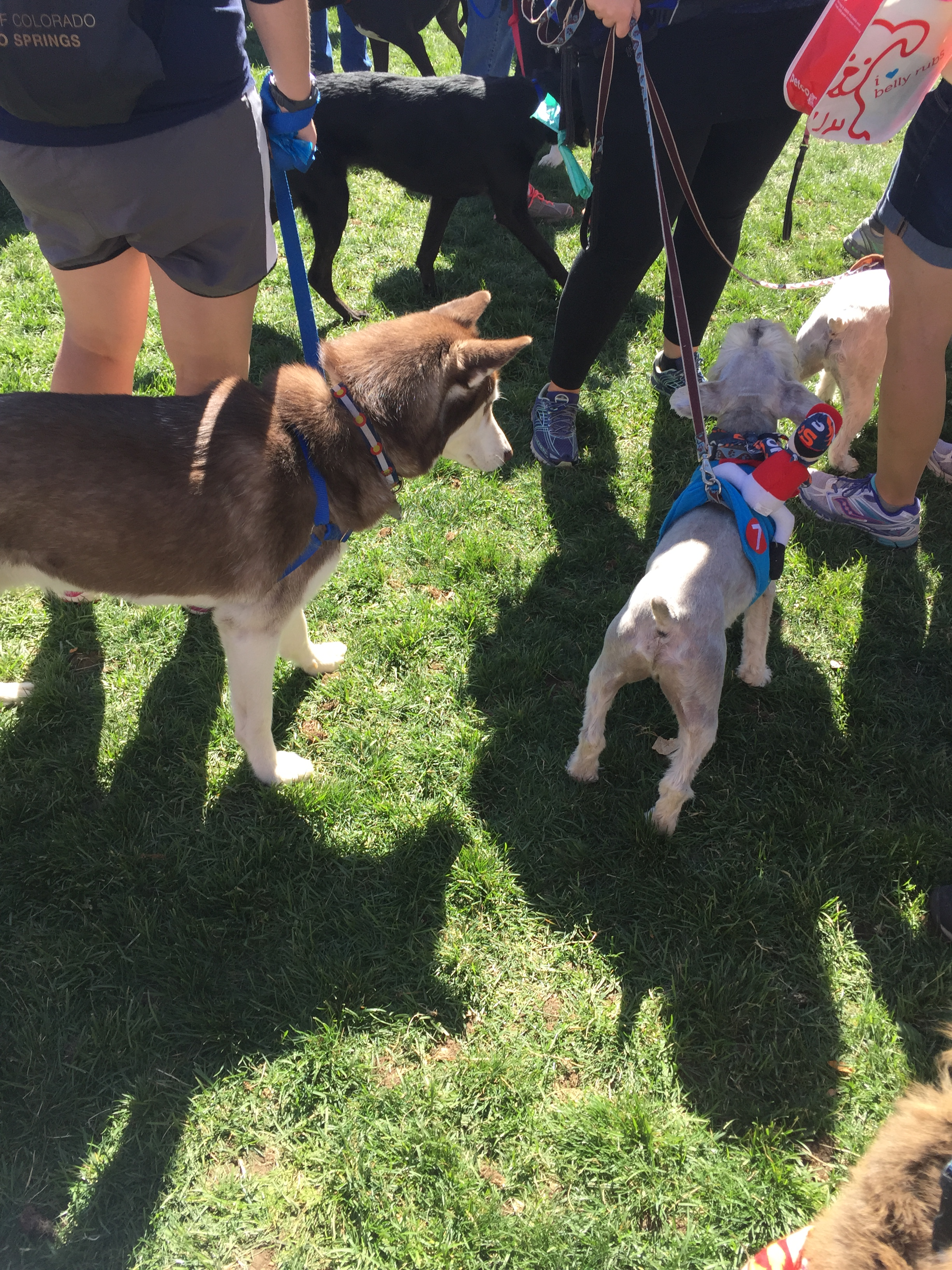

== Recognition ==
Animal Planet acknowledged Pawtoberfest in its Top 10 Dog Festivals Summer Happy Everything list within its first few years.
