= Humane Society of the Pikes Peak Region =

- Abbreviation: HSPPR
- Formation: 1949
- Type: nonprofit organization
- Locations: 610 Abbot Lane, Colorado Springs, CO 80905; 4600 Eagleridge Place, Pueblo, CO 81008
- Region served: Colorado Springs and Pueblo
- Services: Animal welfare group for homeless and abused animals in Southern Colorado
- Website: www.hsppr.org

The Humane Society of the Pikes Peak Region (commonly abbreviated as HSPPR) is a nonprofit corporation in both Colorado Springs, Colorado and Pueblo, Colorado. Incorporated in 1949, HSPPR rescues stray or forsaken pets and facilitates adoption. A variety of fundraising events throughout the fiscal year keep them financially viable.

== Events ==
In the fall, HSPPR hosts the Pawtoberfest 5K/beer festival at Bear Creek Regional Park. During the winter, they hold a 12 Strays of Christmas adoption drive in partnership with Daniels Long Chevrolet.

== Ratings and reviews ==
The Humane Society of the Pikes Peak Region is a Better Business Bureau-accredited charity, meeting the 20 standards of Charity Accountability. In fact, it is rated 100/100 for Transparency & Accountability by Charity Navigator, with an overall rating of 4/4 stars. In terms of animal care certification, HSPPR has also been accredited by the American Animal Hospital Association.
