= Bear Creek Regional Park and Nature Center =

Coordinates: 38°49′15.63″N 104°51′41.9″W

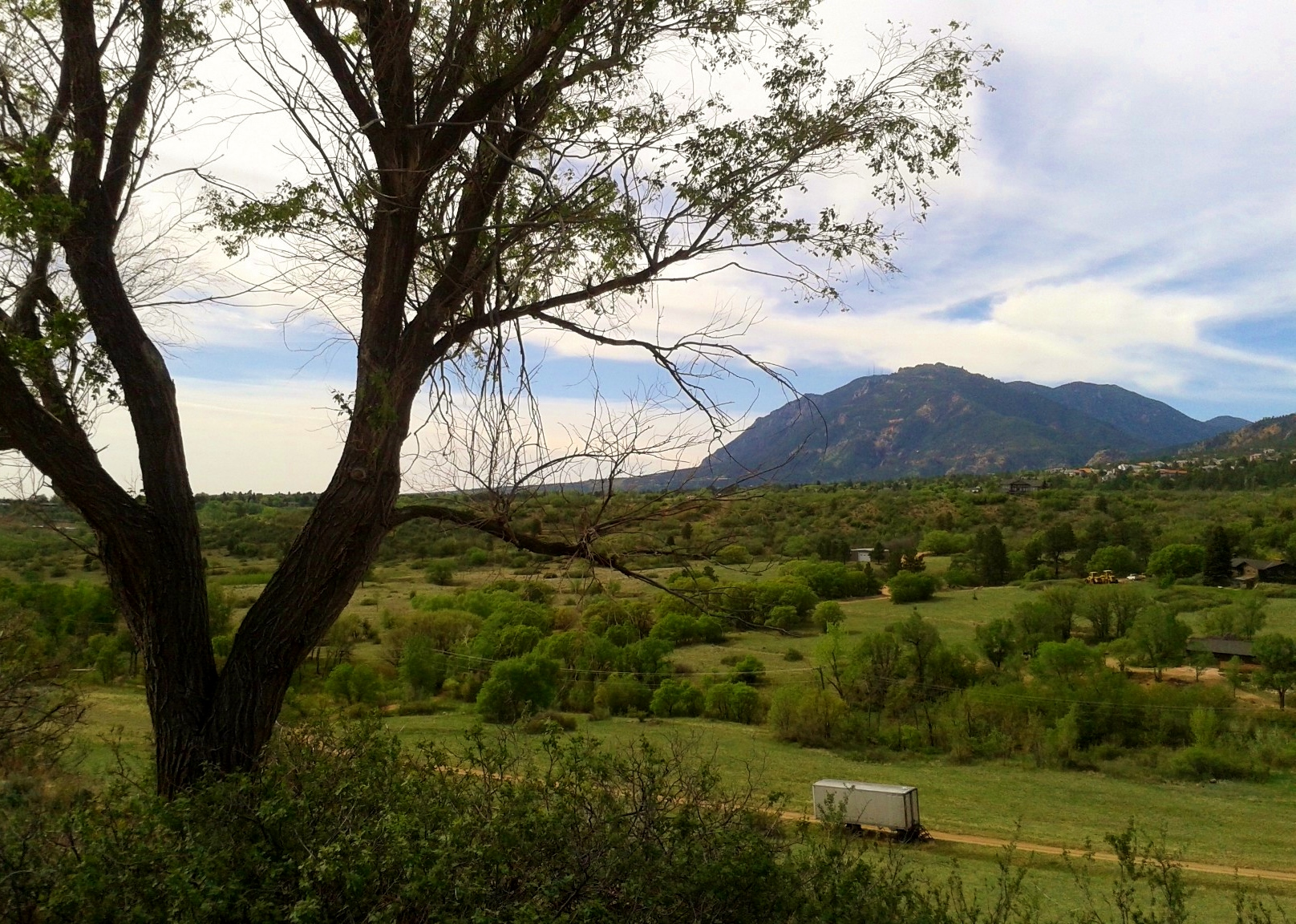
Bear Creek Regional Park 3

Bear Creek Regional Park and Nature Center is a regional park located in Colorado Springs, Colorado that has trails for hiking, horseback riding, running and cycling. Within the park is a nature center and the El Paso Park Headquarters.

There are tennis courts, soccer fields, basketball courts, an archery range, and other sports fields and courts. A section of the park is dedicated as a dog park.

There are also soccer fields. Restrooms, pavilions and most picnic spots are wheelchair accessible.

At the eastern end of the park is a connection to a short trail called the Bear Creek Trail that meets up with the Pikes Peak Greenway. At the western edge of the park, a trail connects to the high-country Bear Creek Cañon Park.

== History ==
From the late 1800s to 1983 or 1984, there was a residential poor farm located on land that became the Bear Creek Park. Gardens were operated for and by the residents to provide food. There was also the Pest House and Pauper's Cemetery on what became park land.

In 1873, and for many years, the only trail up to the Pikes Peak Signal Station started in Manitou Springs and went through Bear Creek Cañon. The 17-mile (27 km) trail also passed through Seven Lakes, Jones Park and the past Lake House at Lake Morraine areas.

== Sections of the park ==
=== Nature center ===
Media presentations, interpretive programs and special events are held at the nature center, located on the western side of the park on Bear Creek Road off of 26th Street and Lower Gold Camp Road. Visitors may take self-guided or guided tours of the trails which include interpretive signs about the park's animals and plants. Horses, pets and bicycles are not allowed on the nature center trail. The nature center is open Tuesday through Saturday throughout the year.

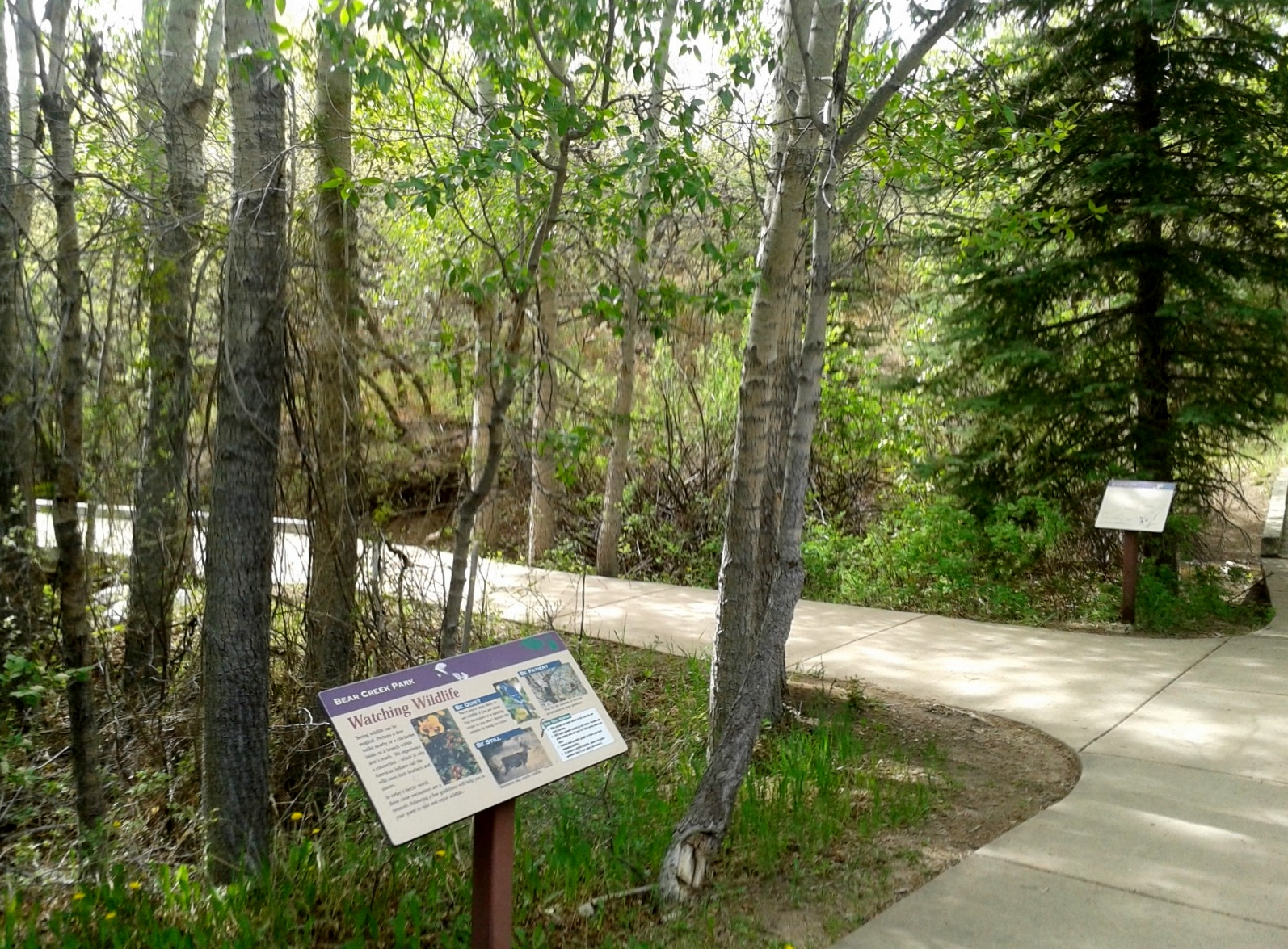
Nature Center

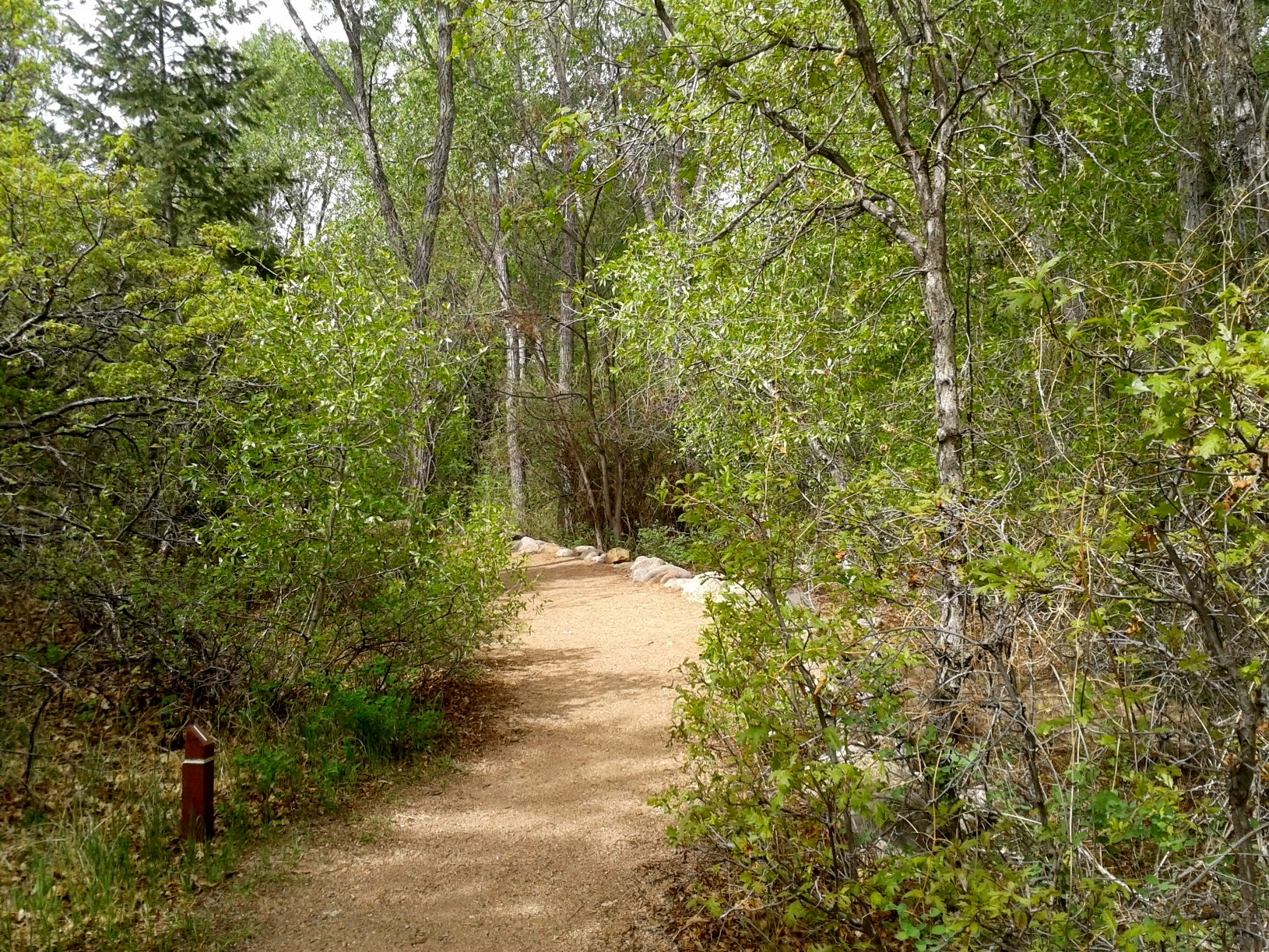
Nature Center

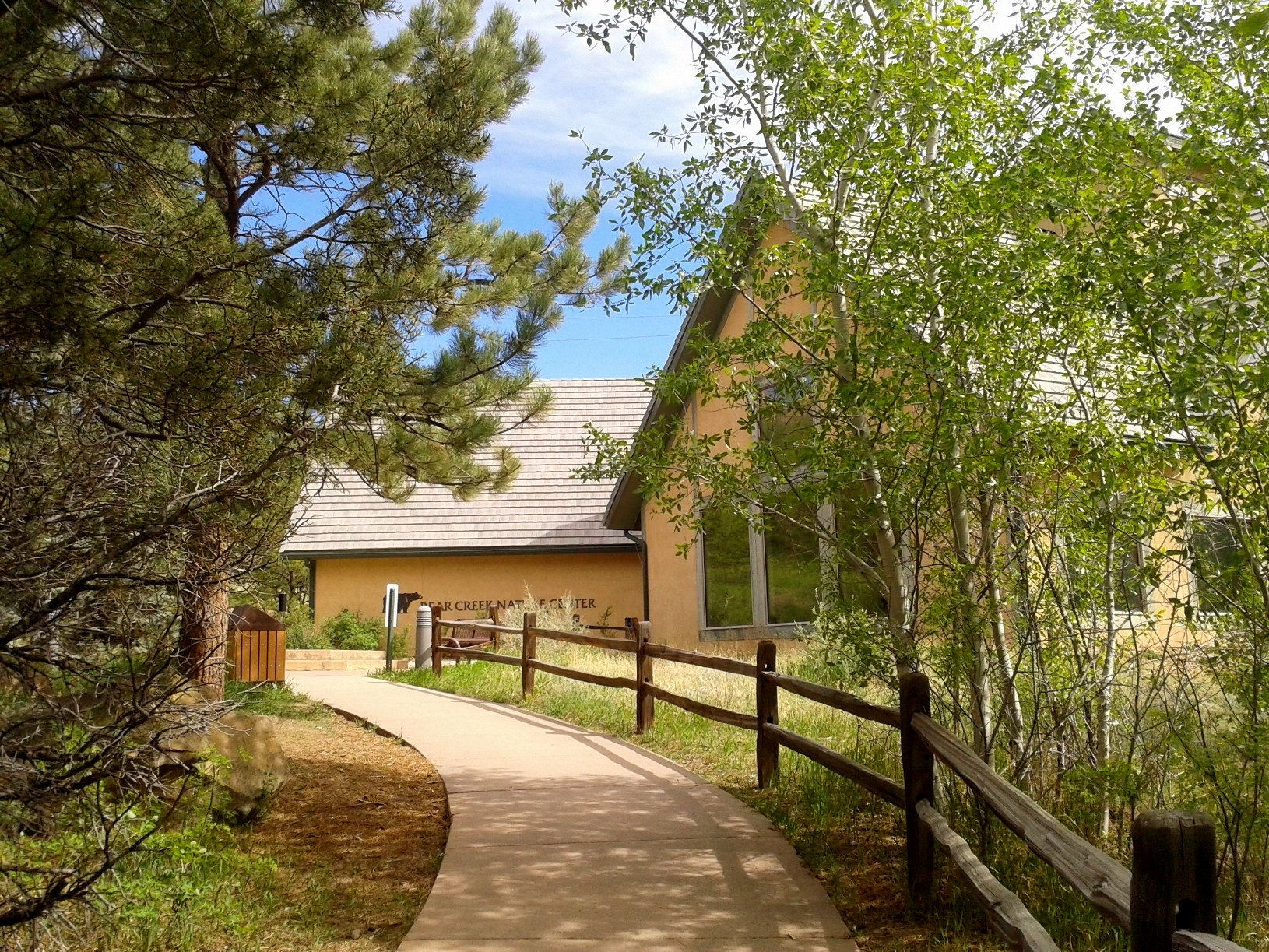
Nature Center

=== Bear Creek Terrace ===
Bear Creek Terrace, the most developed part of the park, includes a picnic area with 5 pavilions, 3 play fields, volleyball area, horseshoe pits, an archery range, and tennis courts. Eight tennis courts are located at 2201 Argus Boulevard.

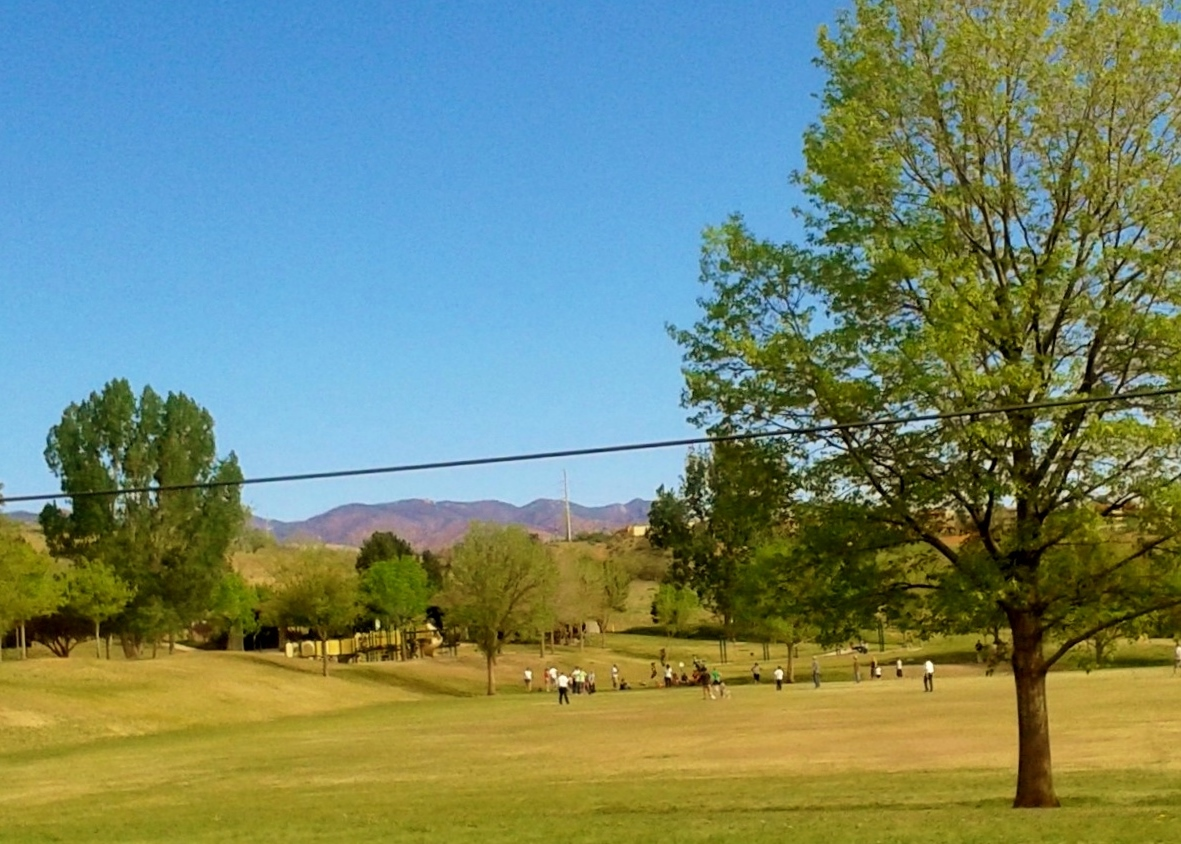
Bear Creek Terrace - Play field and play ground in the background

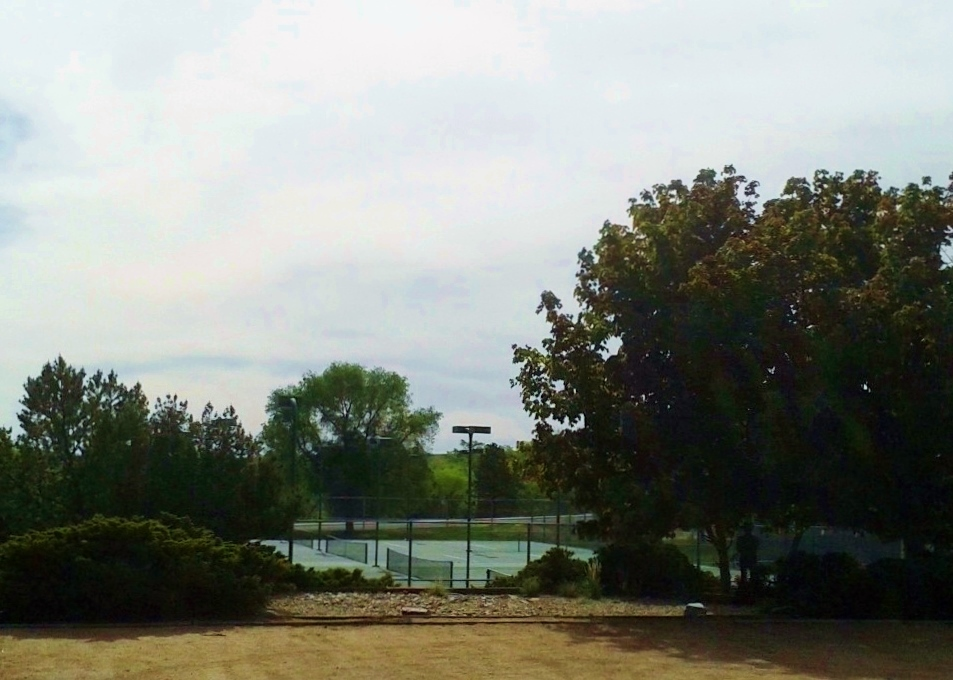
Bear Creek Terrace - Tennis courts 2

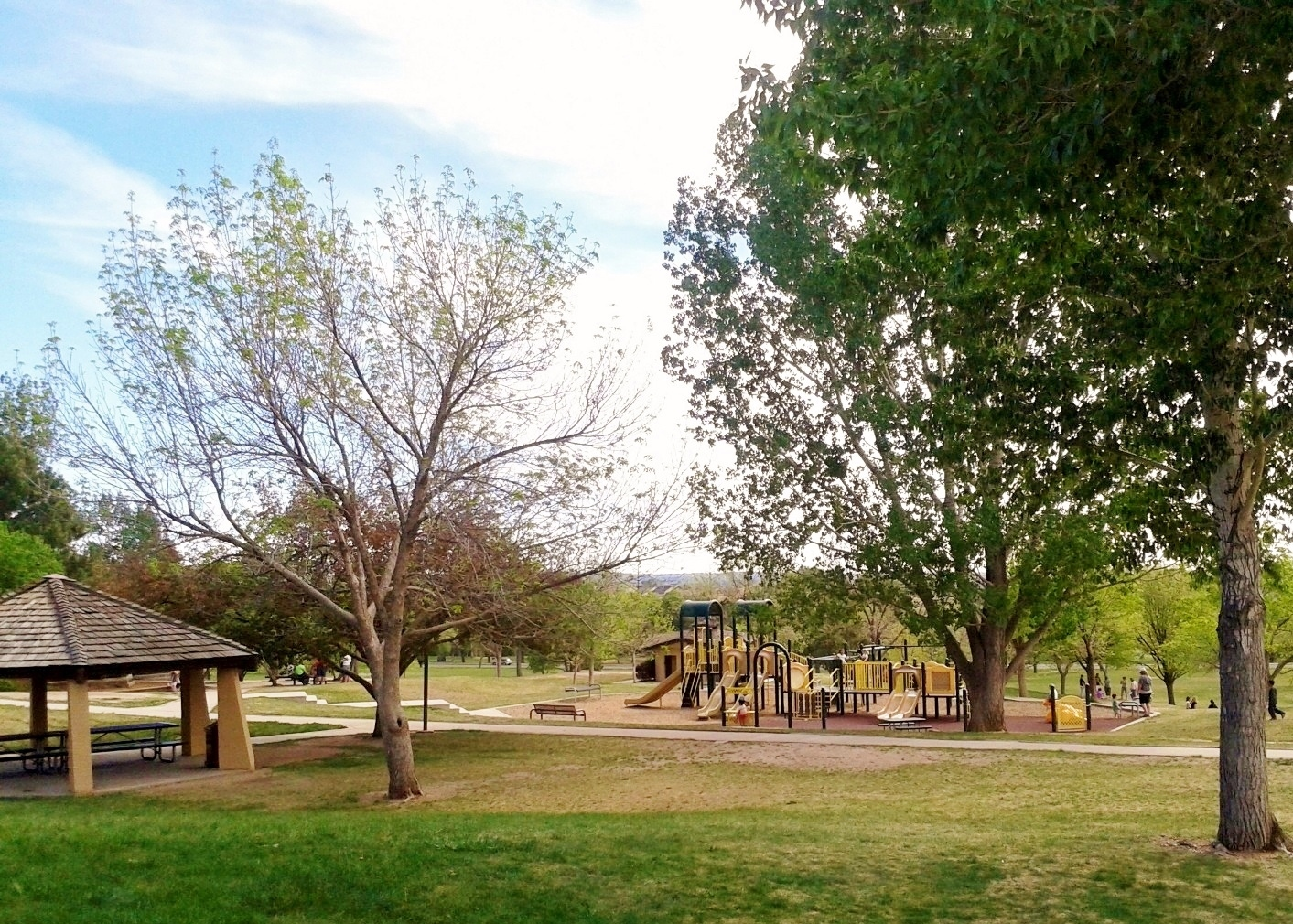
Bear Creek Terrace - Playground and picnic area

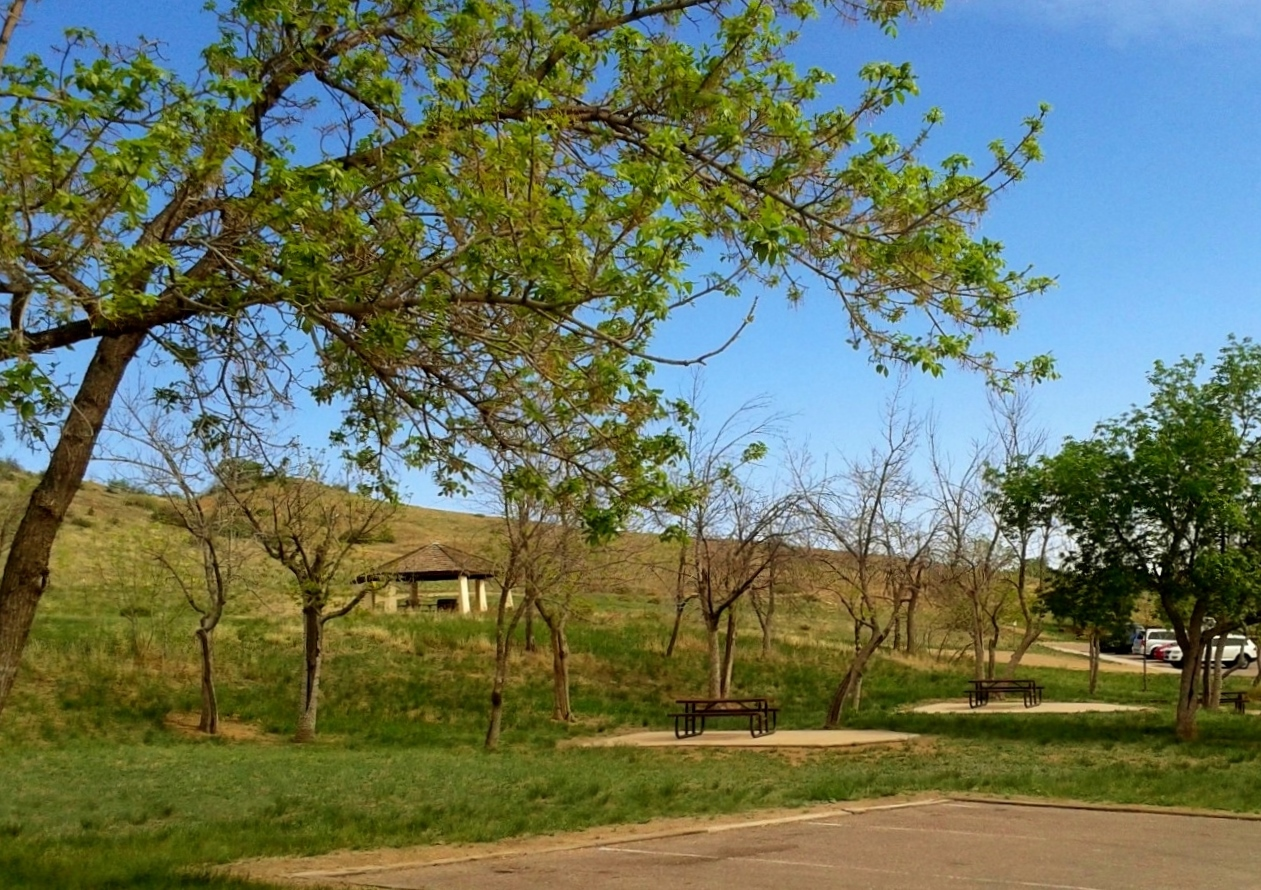
Bear Creek Terrace - Picnic area and trails

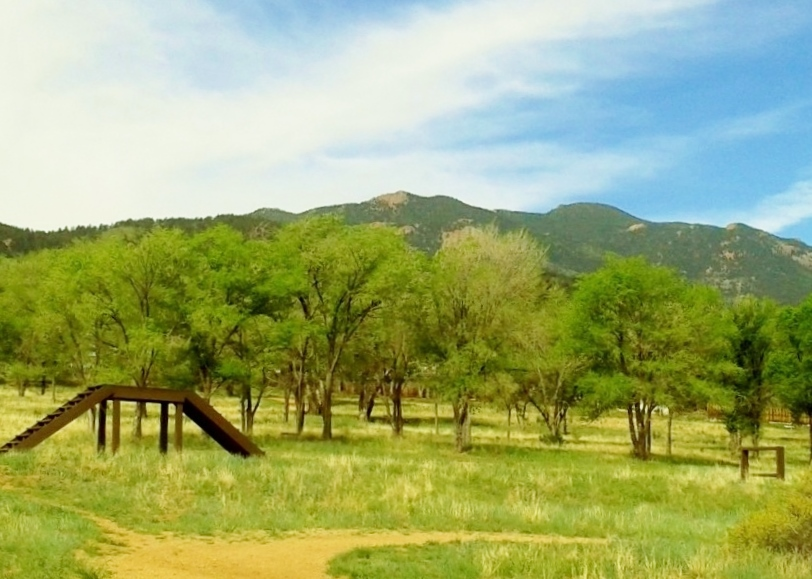
Bear Creek Terrace - Vita course

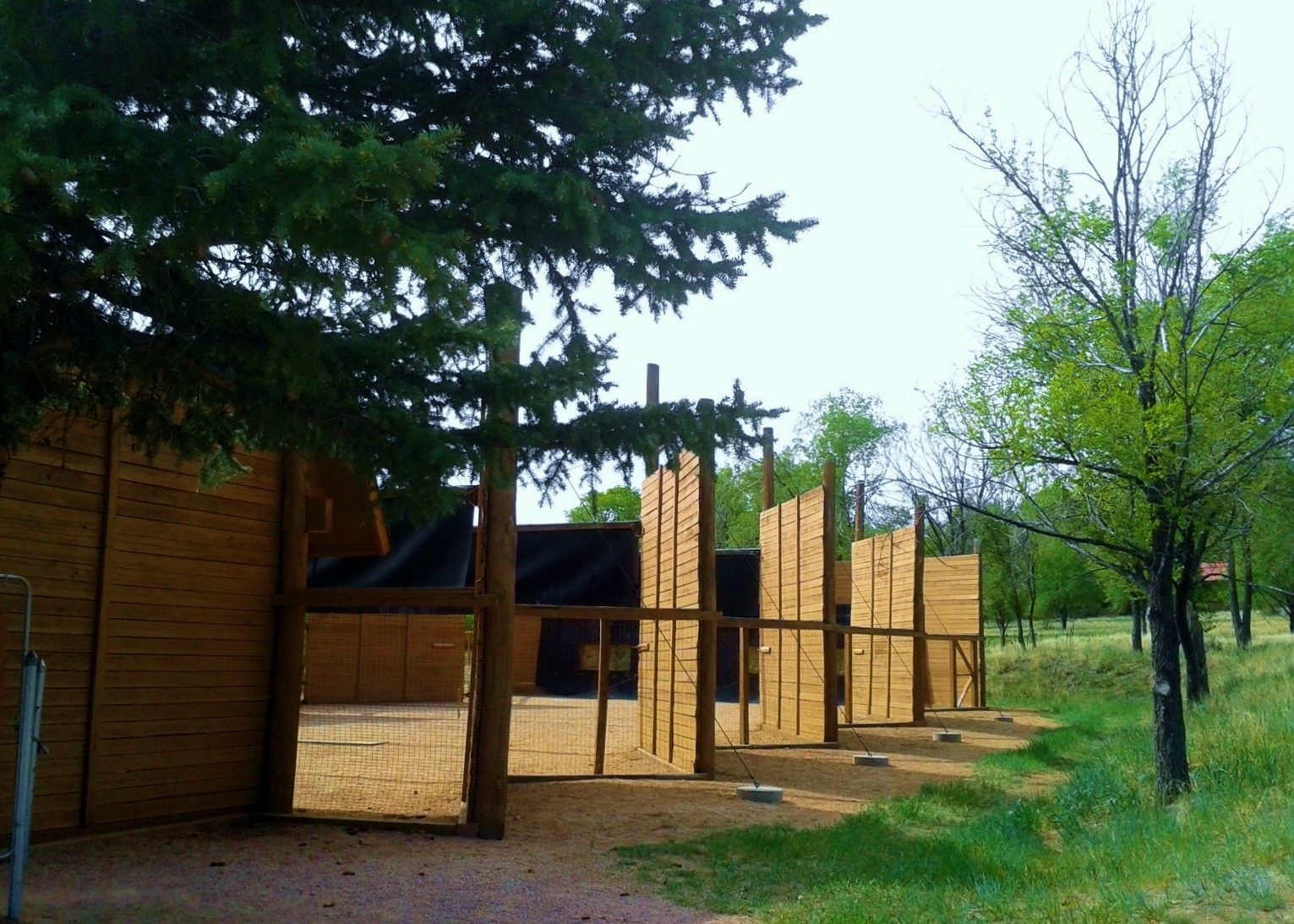
Bear Creek Terrace - Archery range

=== Bear Creek East ===
Bear Creek East also has a picnic area, playground, horseshoe pits and a volleyball court. Bear Creek flows through this area. The Park Headquarters are located in Bear Creek East. It is located east of 21st street.

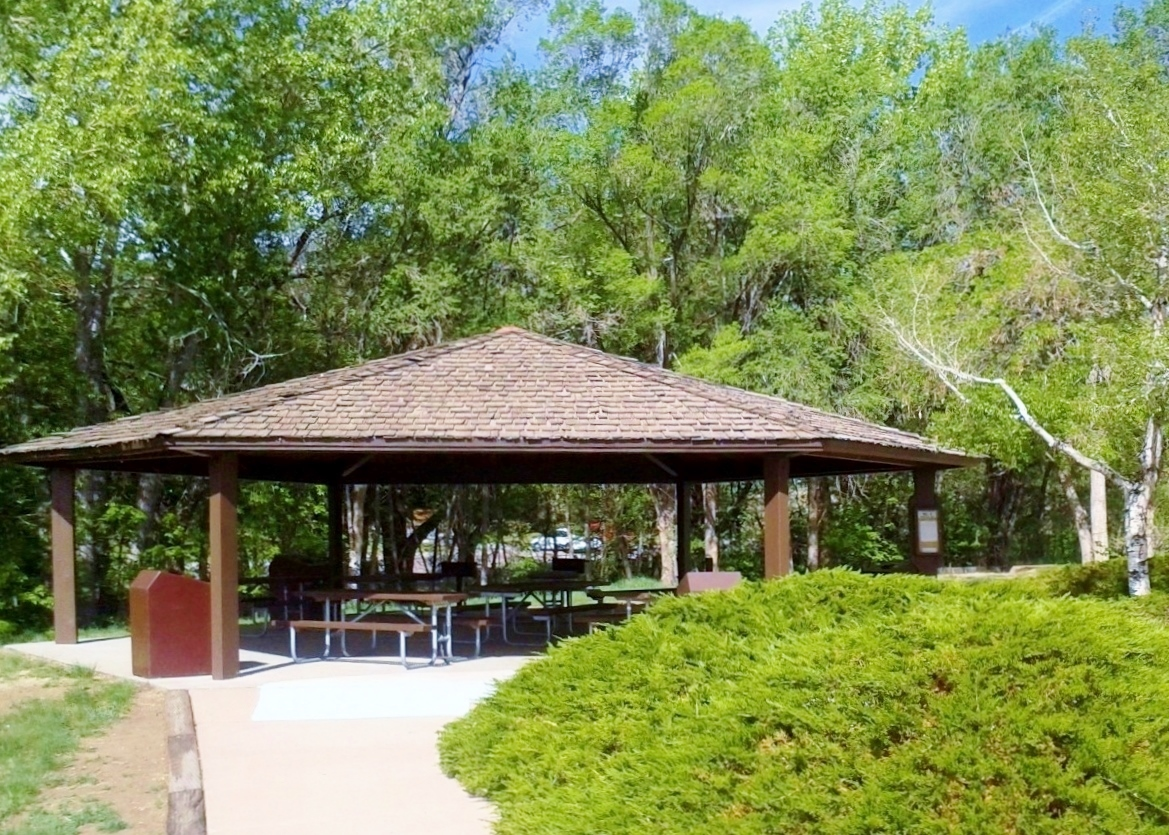
Bear Creek East - Picnic Pavilion

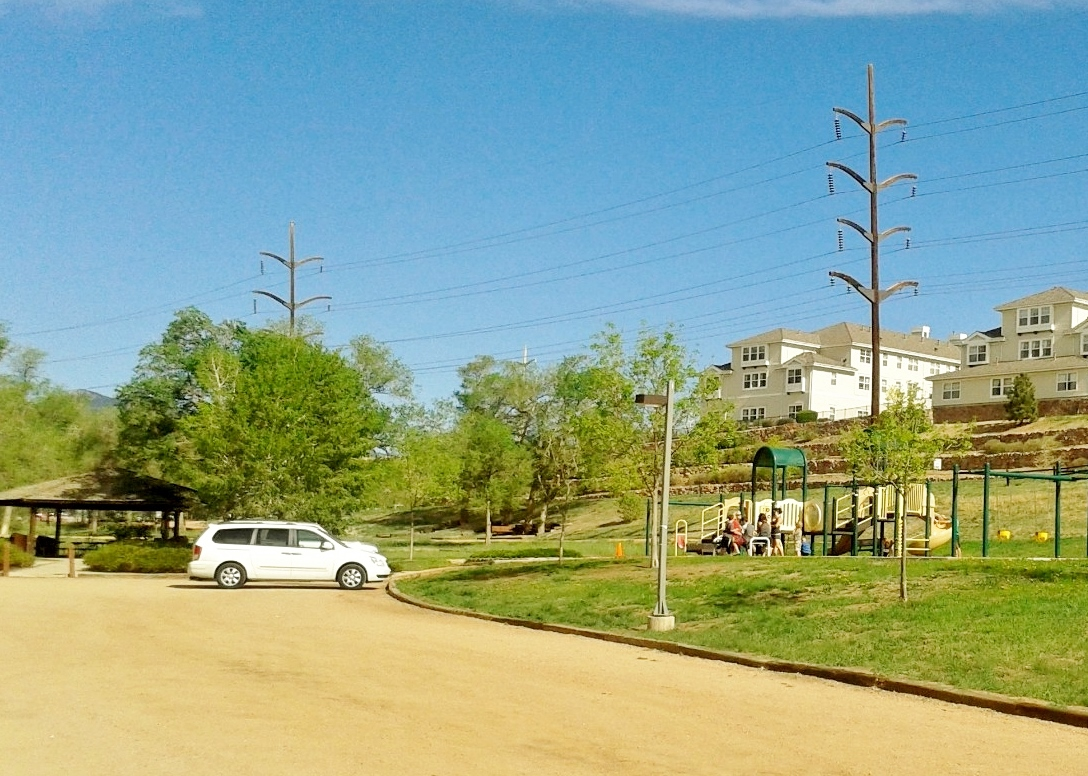
Bear Creek East - Picnic area and playground

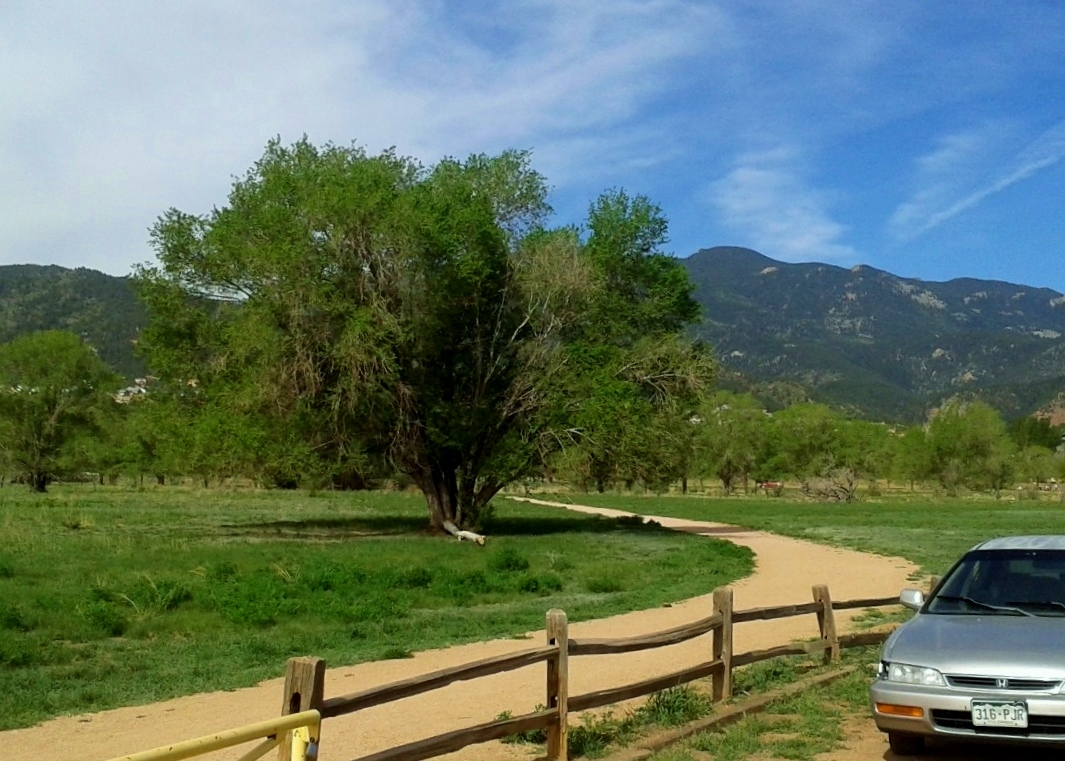
Bear Creek East - Trails

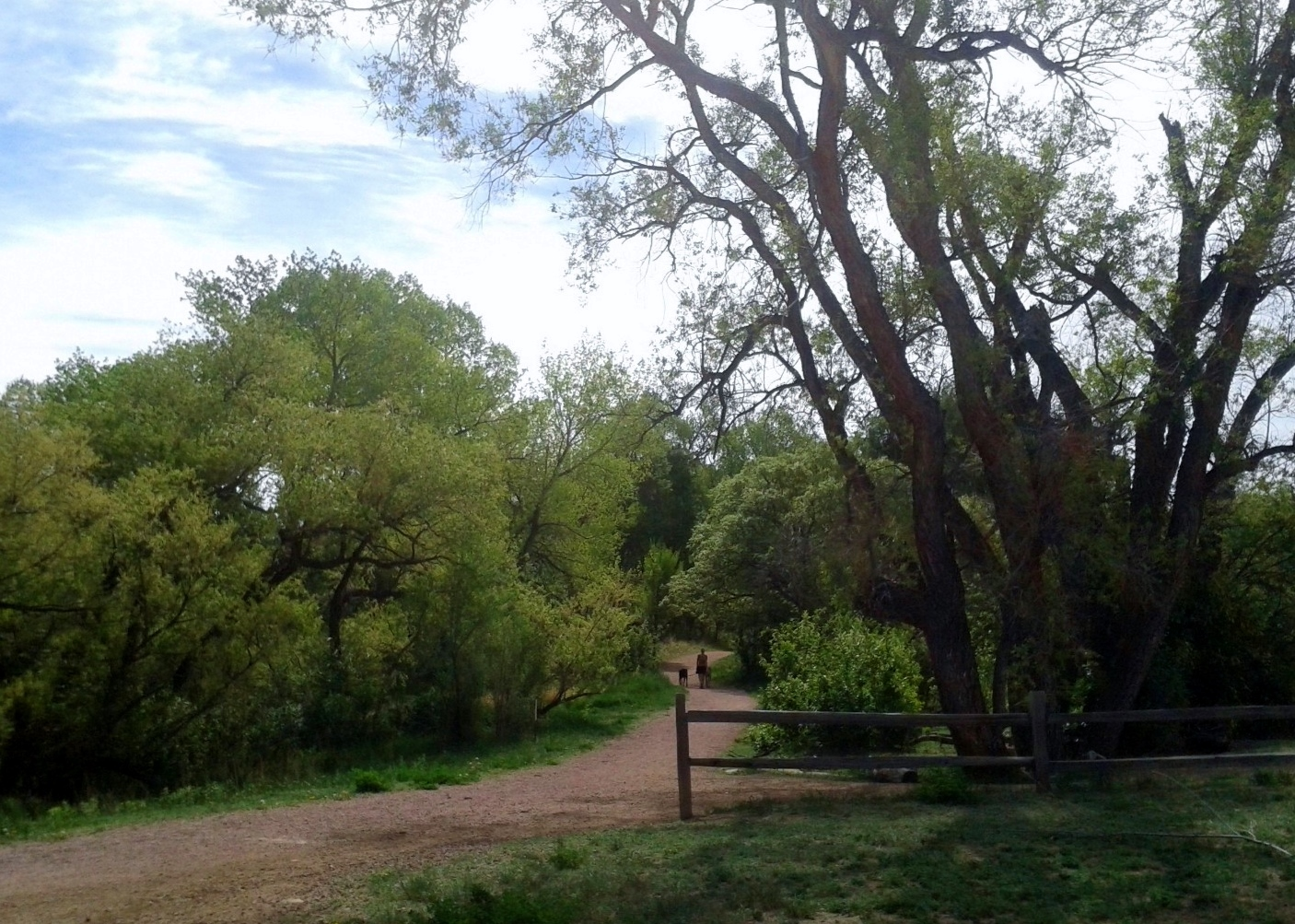
Bear Creek East - Trails

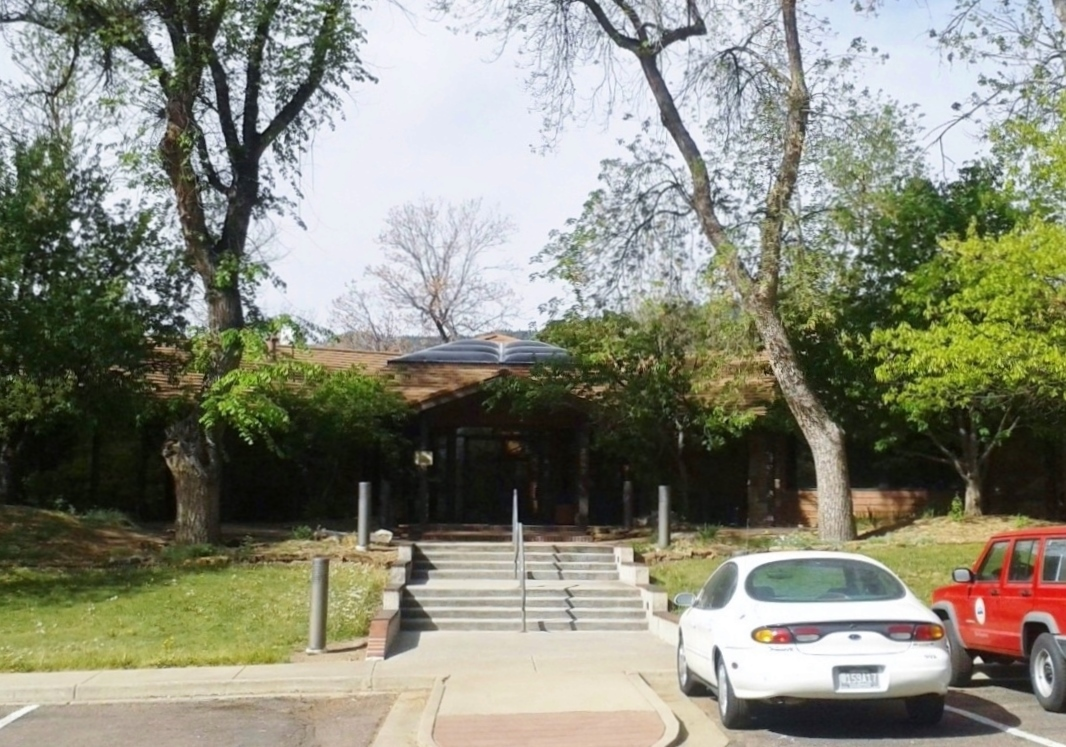
Bear Creek East - El Paso Parks Headquarters

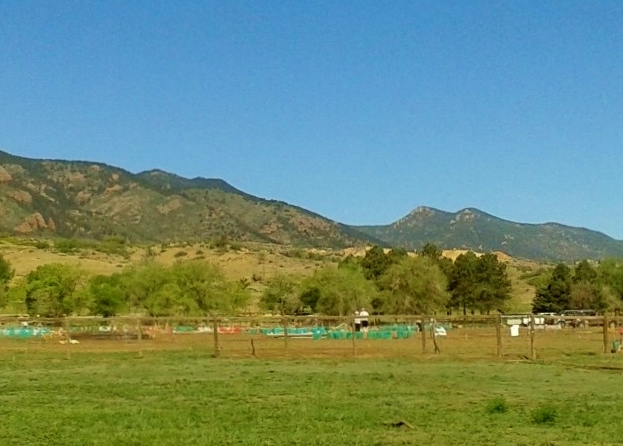
Bear Creek East - Community Garden

=== Dog park ===
The 24-acre (9.7 ha) Bear Creek Dog Park has a 0.75-mile (1.21 km) loop trail that owners and pets can hike on, stabilized pools within 0.25-mile (0.40 km) of creek access for dogs to play in, a holding pen near restrooms and a penned small dog area. About 1/2 of the park is fenced off from the rest of the park to prevent conflicts with other park visitors. It is located at 21st Street and Rio Grande. A volunteer organization, Friends of Bear Creek Dog Park, supports the park.

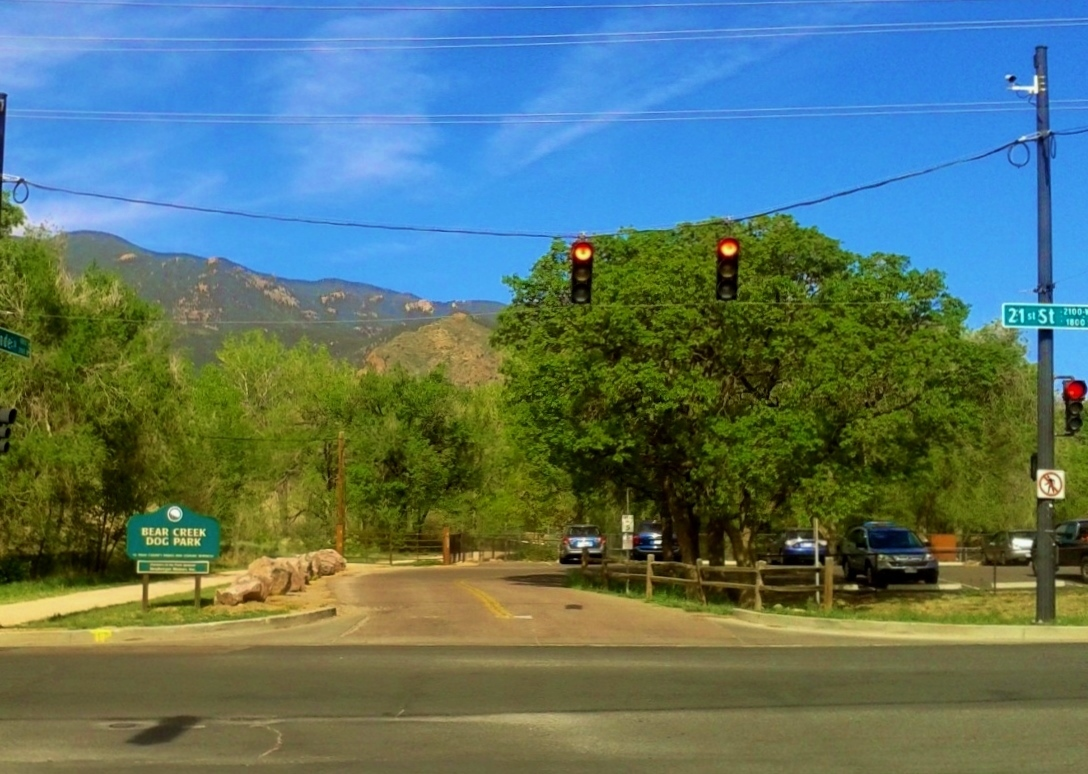
Bear Creek Dog Park Entrance at 21st Street and Rio Grande

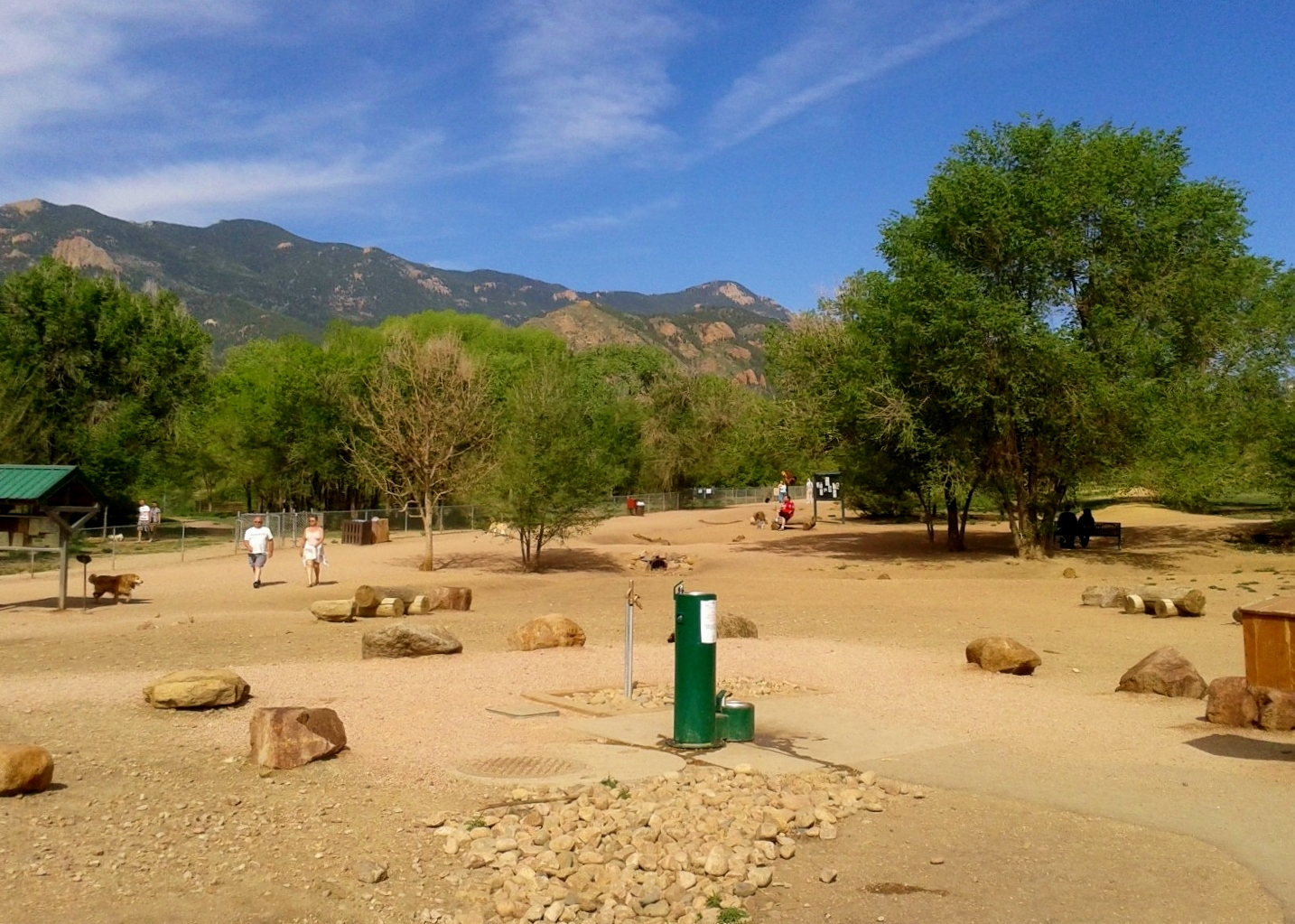
Bear Creek Dog Park

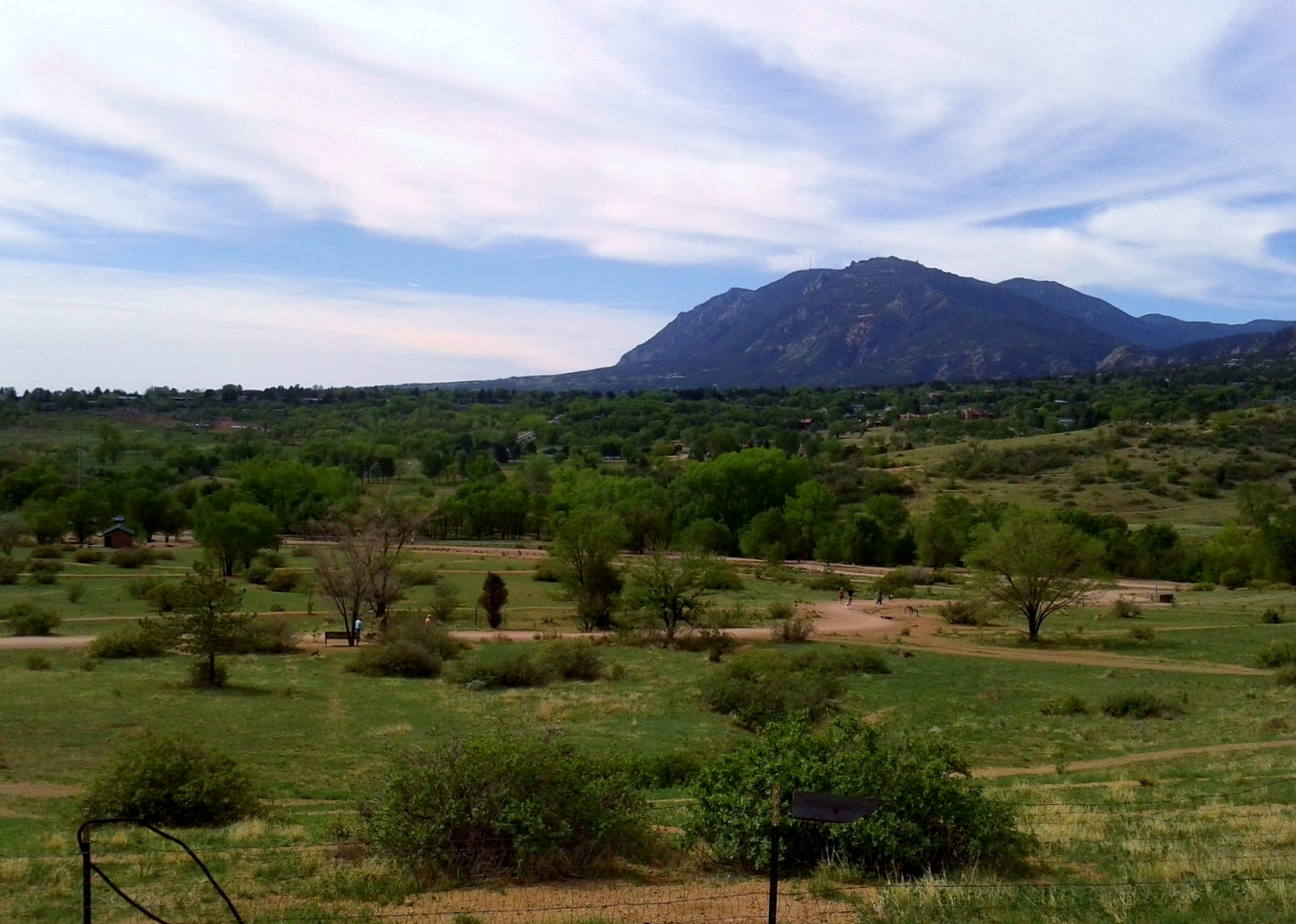
Bear Creek Dog Park trails from Lower Gold Camp Road

== Park ==
=== Trails ===
Nature trails are for hiking, and pets are not allowed. Visitors can hike, walk their pets on a leash or ride horseback on the regional trails. Flora within the park includes ponderosa pine and cottonwood trees, scrub oak, grass prairie and meadows. A mountain creek runs through the park. The trails are open from dawn to dusk each day.

A short 0.4-mile (0.64 km) trail, Bear Creek Trail, provides a trail from the eastern edge of the park at 8th Street to the Pikes Peak Greenway in the Power Plant Reach.

Trails can be accessed at the nature center, picnic pavilions or the 21st Street trail parking lot.

=== Horseback riding ===
Trails for horseback riding can be picked up at the Penrose Equestrian Center on Rido Grande, off of 8th Street. The gravel trails are wide and are good for riding in the winter. The trail can be taken through the park, across creeks and over hills, to 21st Street and ride into section 16 which has steeper hills. The trail is shared with cyclists and hikers.

=== Birdwatching ===
Birds spotted at the park include lesser goldfinch, broad-tailed hummingbird, spotted towhee, Woodhouse's scrub jay, common raven. In May, vireo, flycatcher, and western tanager, and the yellow, Virginia's, and orange-crowned warbler may be seen during their migratory journey. The fall can be a good time to spot towhee, jay, junco, Say's phoebe, red crossbill, and pine siskin. Duck, raptor, bald eagle, wild turkey, and rough-legged hawk may be spotted in the winter. Many other varieties have been spotted.

=== Wildlife ===
Coyote, mule deer, and elk range through the park.

== Parks Department offices ==
The El Paso County Parks Department offices are located at 2002 Creek Crossing St., off of 21st Street.

== Events ==
- July - Summer Roundup Trail Run 12K
- August - Colorado Springs 5K Run

Other events include The BRC Down and Dirty Trail Series, Sand Creek Mountain Bike Series, and the Fall Series.
