= List of Manitou Springs Historic District buildings =

Coordinates: 38.8597°N 104.9172°W

This List of Manitou Springs Historic District buildings includes 80 buildings and resources in the historic district of Manitou Springs, Colorado.

Location of Manitou Springs, Colorado in the United States of America.

== Buildings ==
Name or title	Image	Type	Street	Street number	Comment
Red Crags		High-style	El Paso Boulevard	302	Dr. William Abraham Bell ran Red Crags Sanatorium as a tuberculosis hospital. The building was constructed in 1889. Currently it is a bed and breakfast.
Craftwood Inn		High-style	El Paso Boulevard	404	Craftwood was first a coppersmith's workshop and later a restaurant, "attracting dignitaries and celebrities."
Rockledge and Onaledge		High-style	El Paso Boulevard	328	Rockledge, built in 1913, was the home of Edward Harrison Heath, a farm journal publisher. It is now a bed and breakfast, as is Onaledge, which was a Craftwood Association residence.
Nolan House		High-style	Grand Avenue	2	The home was built in 1890 for John Nolan who owned several saloons and a Cripple Creek gambling hall.
Redstone Castle		High-style	Iron Mountain		Off of Pawnee, stands by itself at a high elevation, also called Crawford House.
Miramont Castle		High-style	Capitol Hill	9	The Queene Anne style buildings, with other European castle influences, was built for Father Francolon by the Gillis Brothers in 1895. It is now a museum.
Public Library		Institutional	Manitou Avenue	701	The library was built in 1911 with funding from the Andrew Carnegie Foundation and is the first permanent library in the city.
Hydro-Electric Plant		Institutional	Ruxton	540	The 1905 building has a "modernistic and formal facade" of red brick. Its front is "dominated by two large arched windows with fanlights."
Crystal Valley Cemetery		Institutional	Plainview	End	The cemetery is located in southeastern Manitou Springs. At the entrance is a green sandstone building and stone walls. A notable structure is the Egyptian Revival mausoleum of the Richards family.
First Ute Path		Institutional	Shelf	1872	The 1872 Shelf Road was the first Ute Pass road that runs along Fountain Creek. A "remnant" of the road is located near U.S. Highway 24 and Serpentine Drive. It was built "to service suppliers to the mining camps beyond South Park."
Congregational Church		Church	Pawnee	101	Built in 1880, the church is the oldest continuous use Congregational Church in Colorado.
Our Lady of Perpetual; Help Catholic Church		Catholic Church	Ruxton	218	"A Gothic and Shingle style small 'country' church - done in a simple, symmetrical style with a repeated front gable and entry motif. A greenstone rustic bridge leads across Ruxton Creek and a cobblestone grotto and several walls surround the church."
St. Andrew's Episcopal; Church		Church	Manitou Avenue	808	A chapel was built in 1880 and was originally located on Canon Avenue. In 1885 it was moved across Canon Avenue. Then in 1905 the St. Andrew's Episcopal Church was built at Manitou and Canon Avenues.
Yount's Quarry		Industrial	Highway 24		Below Rainbow Falls, west of town. Green sandstone from the quarry was used in the construction of buildings, porches, walls and foundations in Manitou Springs.
Midland Railroad		Industrial			Beginning 1887, Midland Railroad ran through Manitou Springs, crossed Ruxton Avenue near the Manitou Incline and then up Ute Pass. The railway contributed to the development of resorts along Ute Pass, but "never had great financial success." Investors included Jerome B. Wheeler, J. J. Hagerman, and Irving Howbert. Some reinforced embankments and tunnels remain, but the tracks have been removed.
Manitou Incline		Industrial	Ruxton		The incline was built in 1907 as a tourist attraction. Passengers reached the top of the incline via cable cars where they had access to a picnic area and refreshment facility. It was lighted at night during the summers.
Cog Railroad		Industrial	Ruxton	515	The cog railway, built in 1891, continues to be a means of transportation up Pikes Peak. Memorial Park is home to one of the early engines.
Barker House		Hotels and lodging	Manitou Avenue	819	The original structure for the Barker House was built in 1872. In 1880 Charles Barker purchased the building and expanded it into a "large resort hotel". Barker House has not been a hotel for years and is a private, Residential Apartment building.
Grand View Hotel		Hotels and lodging	Osage	935	The hotel was built in the 1880s. It is a large frame building with wooden siding.
Cliff House		Hotels and lodging	Canon	306	The Cliff House was built in 1874, has a reputation as the "finest hotel" in Manitou Springs and has lodged "numerous" famous individuals.
Boarding Houses		Hotels and lodging	Winter Street	442, 444	The boarding houses are large square frame buildings.
El Colorado Lodge		Hotels and lodging	Manitou Avenue	23	Built in 1926, it was "a benchmark of motor-travel camps of the West."
McLaughlin Family Lodge		Hotels and lodging	Crystal Park	183	Log or slab siding cabins surround a central lodge.
Wheeler Bank		Commercial	Manitou Avenue	717-719	Built in 1888, it was Manitou Springs first bank. Its building was used as an opera house and a dry goods store.
Leddy Block		Commercial	Manitou Avenue	734	The masonry building was built by the Gillis Brothers in 1891.
Manitou Spa		Commercial	Manitou Avenue	934	It is a historic building located along Fountain Creek in Manitou Springs, Colorado. Once used as a mineral water bathhouse or spa, the building now used for stores and other businesses. It is on the National Register of Historic Places.
Iron Geyser and Pavilion		Special features	Ruxton Avenue		J. C. Hiestand drilled the geyser in 1910 that used to erupt every 30 minutes. Now, spring water is available from a fountain.
Cheyenne Spring House		Special features	Manitou Avenue	934	Around the turn of the 20th century, the spring was enclosed in the red sandstone spring house.
Public Stairway		Special features	Capitol Hill		At Capitol Hill and Iron Road
Wheeler Clock		Special features	Manitou Avenue	802	To commemorate the opening of the Manitou Mineral Water Company, Jerome B. Wheeler, had the Wheeler Clock built in 1890. The goddess Hebe represents the purported youth-giving properties of Manitou Springs water, which used to flow from the sculpture.
Rainbow Falls		Special features	Serpentine Drive	Near	Fountain Creek, near U.S. Highway 24 and Serpentine Drive. In 1872 the old wagon road through Ute Pass started at Rainbow Falls, or Ute Pass Falls. In 1932 a new road was built that better accommodated automotive vehicles. The falls are now partially obscured by U.S. Highway 24. It is located in the Fountain Creek watershed drainage area, following Ute Pass (U.S. Highway 24) eastward from Woodland Park.
Manitou Place stairway		Stonework	Manitou Avenue	900 block	Stairway from the 900 block of Manitou Avenue to Manitou Place, roughly in the location of the Grand View Hotel.
Residential stonework		Stonework	Washington	131	Walls, stairway, porch piers, foundation and garage
Bridge over Fountain Creek		Stonework	Manitou Avenue	502	Bridge over Fountain Creek at the eastern edge of Memorial Park at Old Man's Trail. Prior to the construction of the stone "Bridge over Fountain Creek" over Old Man's Trail, there was a bridge constructed to deliver visitors to the Manitou House Hotel. The hotel, the first in Manitou Springs, was built by William Jackson Palmer and William Abraham Bell, who had founded the resort town. (Note that another bridge near Manitou Springs bringing Business Route 24 over Fountain Creek is separately listed on the National Register.)
House		High-style	Spencer	201	
House		High-style	Canon	408	
House		High-style	Capitol Hill	153	
House		High-style	Grand Avenue	32	
House		High-style	Grand Avenue	26	
House		Victorian	Spencer	106	Turret and shingles
House		Victorian	Duclo	719	Turret and shingles
House		Victorian	Deer Path	112	Center gable
House		Victorian	Duclo	809	Center gable
House		Victorian	Cave	125	Chalet
House		Victorian	Mohawk	102	Chalet
House		Victorian	Cave	103	Five dormer gables
House		Victorian	Deer Path	114	One story with wrap-around porch
House		Victorian	Osage	945	L-shaped with horizontal wing and porch.
House		Victorian	Duclo	813	
House		Victorian	Prospect	959	
House		Victorian	Osage	923	
House		Victorian	Navajo	106	
House		Victorian	Grand Avenue	42	
House		Victorian	Grand Avenue	41	
House		Victorian	Ruxton	151	
House		Victorian	Ruxton	15	
House		Victorian	Midland	809	
House		Victorian	Duclo	803	
House		Victorian	Ruxton	106	
House		Victorian	Waltham	106	
House		Victorian	Ruxton	349	
House		Cottage	Capitol Hill	110	
House		Cottage	Cave	121	
House		Cottage	Cave	109	
House		Cottage	Ruxton	622	
House		Cottage	Oklahoma	319	
House		Cottage	Elk Path	9	
House		Cottage	Washington	301	
House		Cabin	Duncan	107	
House		Cabin	Modoc	114	
House		Cabin	Fairmont	42	
House		Cabin	Crystal Park Road	102	
House		Cabin	Chelton Road	191	
House		Bungalow	Iron Road	204	
House		Bungalow	Washington	15	
House		Bungalow	Lincoln	48	
House		Bungalow	Duclo	731	
House		Bungalow	Prospect	911	

== See also ==
- National Register of Historic Places listings in El Paso County, Colorado
- Bibliography of Colorado
- Geography of Colorado
- History of Colorado
- Index of Colorado-related articles
- List of Colorado-related lists
- Outline of Colorado

== Notes ==
1. Victorian is Vernacular Victorian Frame
