= Manitou Bathhouse =

- Manitou Bathhouse (Manitou Spa)
- U.S. National Register of Historic Places
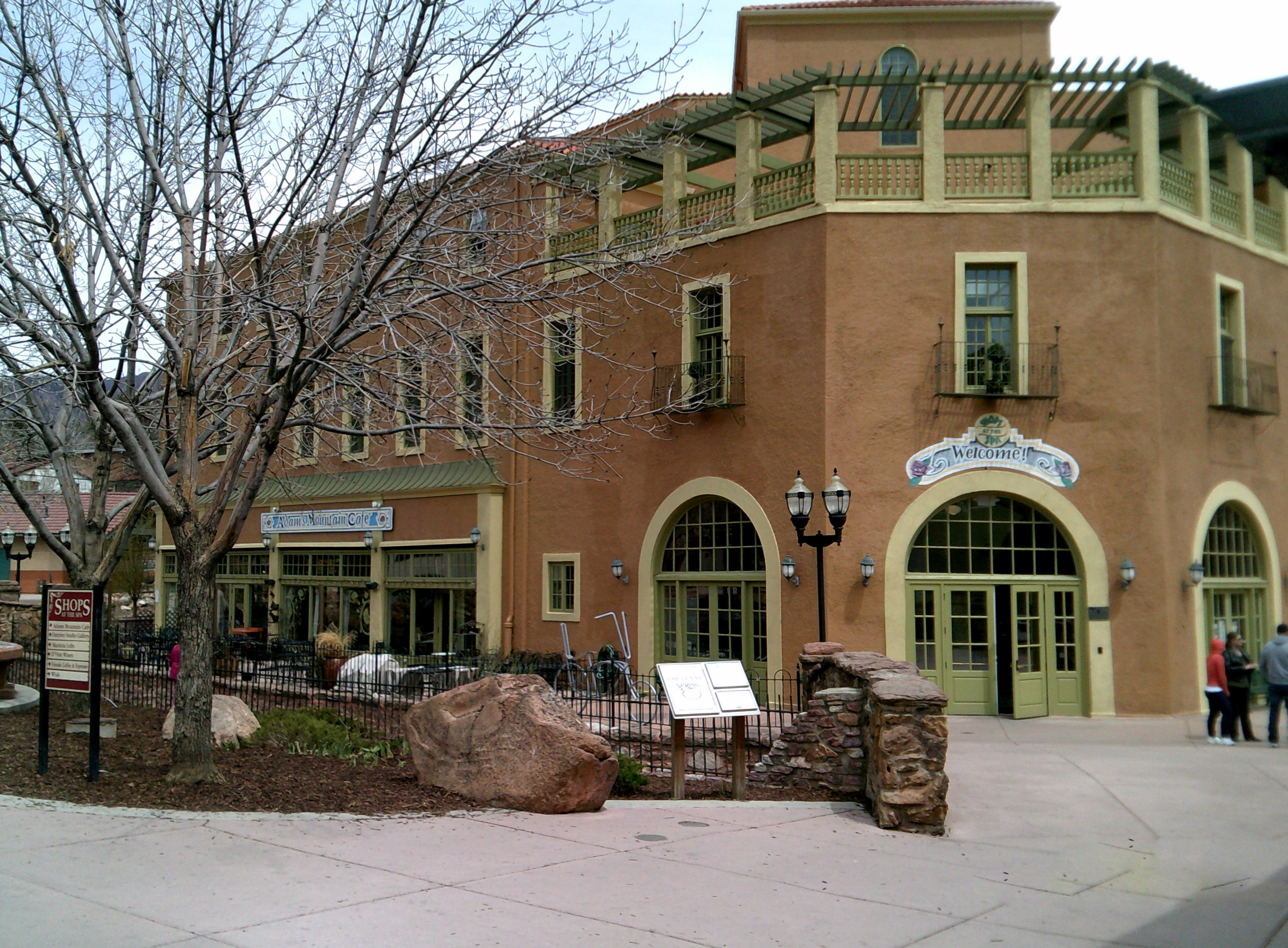

- Location within Colorado Location within the United States
- Location: 934 Manitou Avenue, Manitou Springs, Colorado
- Coordinates: 38°51′34.45″N 104°55′5.68″W
- Architectural style: Mission and Spanish Revival
- NRHP reference No.: 79000608
- Added to NRHP: 1979

Manitou Bathhouse or Manitou Spa is a historic building located along Fountain Creek in Manitou Springs, Colorado. It was once used as a mineral water bathhouse or spa, but now progressed into business establishments in the first floor and residential units on the second and third floors. It is registered in the National Register of Historic Places for its history. The building houses hidden gems including Manitou Winery, Theo's Toys, Colorado Art of Facts, and Border Burger Bar.

The Manitou Spa building is located near several natural mineral springs and within the building is the Soda Spring. The spa was the "town's social center" in the early 1900s.

The building was constructed around 1920 or 1921, and known to serve infirm and healthy people. One of the resources in the Save America's Treasures project, the hotel and spa resort building retains its original marble floors, bar and murals. Before it was renovated in 2005, it was vacant due to flooding and disrepair.

The original bathhouse was built in 1882 to 1883 and was torn down in 1923, or in 1921. Visitors to the bathhouse could bathe in a cool plunge pool, relax in hot mineral water baths, visit the physician or relax in one of the reading rooms.

== Gallery ==
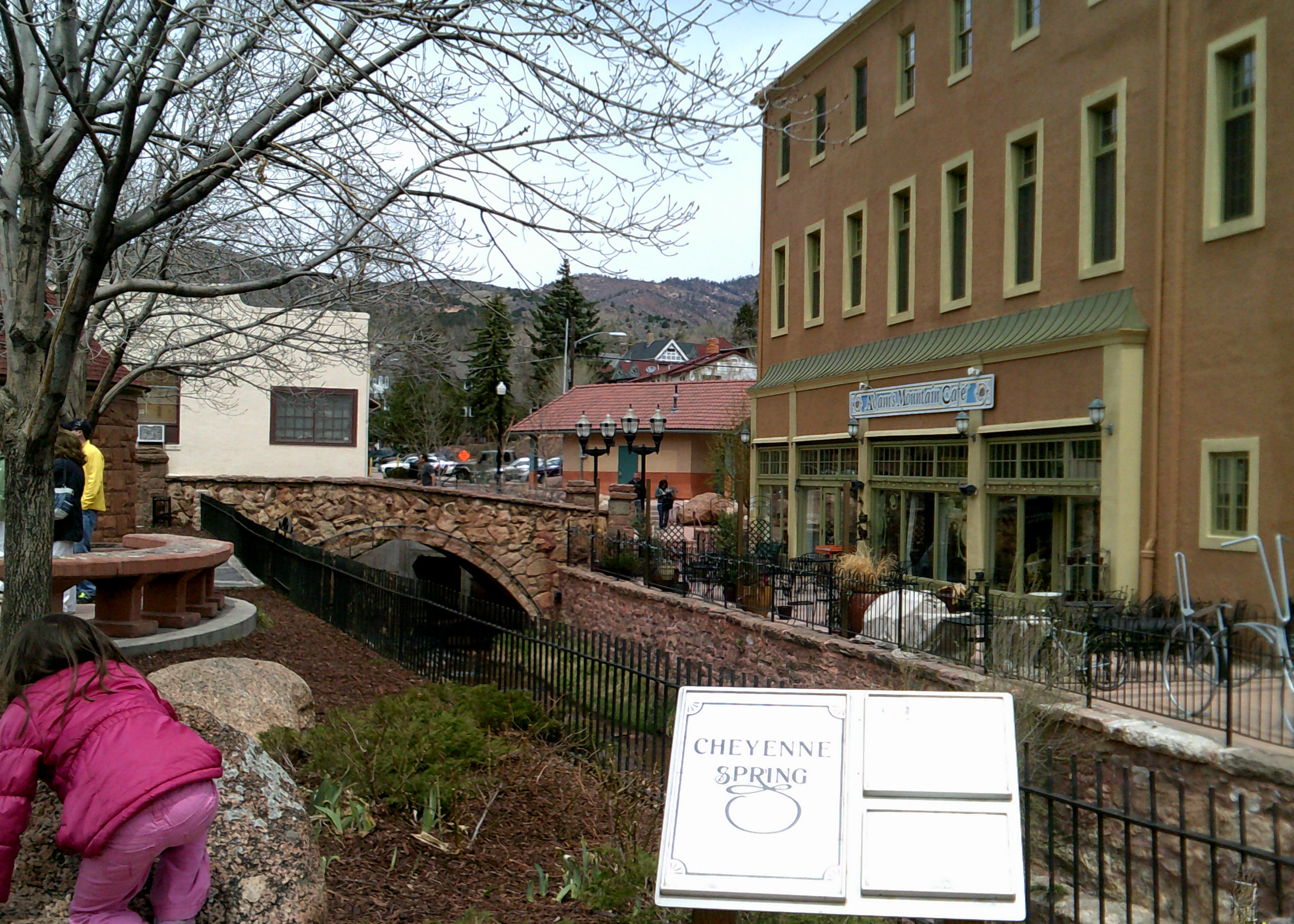
The side of the Spa, with bridge over Fountain Creek

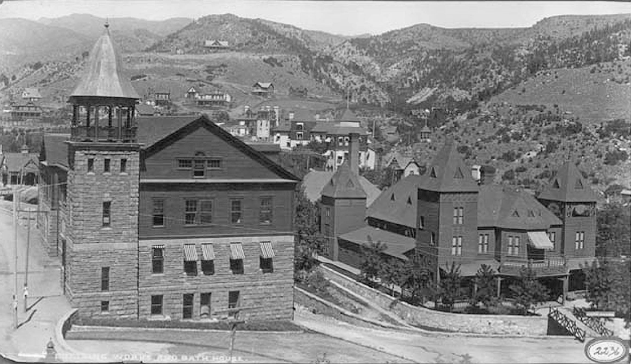
Manitou Mineral Water Bottling Plant (left) and Manitou Bathhouse (right), photograph taken in early 1890s

== See also ==
- Manitou Springs Historic District
- List of Manitou Springs Historic District buildings
