= Redstone Castle (Manitou Springs, Colorado) =

Historic house in Colorado, United States

- U.S. Historic district – Contributing property
- Location within Colorado
- Location: Manitou Springs, Colorado
- Coordinates: 38°51′9.08″N 104°54′46.16″W
- Part of: Manitou Springs Historic District (ID83003516)

Redstone Castle or Crawford House is a historic building in Manitou Springs, located within the Manitou Springs Historic District.

== Overview ==
It is located on 75 acres (30 ha) off of Pawnee Avenue and Iron Mountain Road. The large Queen Anne house is made of red sandstone. It was once a bed and breakfast, but is now privately owned.

== Dr. Isaac Davis ==
Dr. Isaac Davis, an English physician, moved to Manitou Springs in 1874 and was one of the city's founders. He and his family homesteaded the land that Redstone Castle sits on. The father of 15 owned several businesses in town including a shoe store on Canon Avenue and a pharmacy. His health declined significantly after the Stringler trial of the death of a woman from a morphine overdose. The woman's husband accused the doctor, and he was exonerated. His health continued to decline and as a result he sold his homestead in 1880 or 1881 to two brothers named Davis, but unrelated to the doctor. The purchase agreement included the words: "Buyer Beware" and carried a stipulation that the graves of "early trappers, pioneers, soldiers and vagabonds" were to be moved to the new Crystal Valley Cemetery.

== Davis brothers ==
The Davis brothers built Redstone Castle in 1890 as a model home for an elite development called Manitou Terrace Estates on Iron Mountain. They published ads to attract the wealthy and established colorful billboards in the east of Garden of the Gods, Pikes Peak and Rainbow Falls. None of the lots sold, however, reputedly because buyers learned that the land was haunted. Some believed this was because some, but not all, of the graves had been moved from the hillside to the Crystal Valley Cemetery.

== Hawkins family ==
The castle was vacant for years. Balem Hawkins was hired as caretaker of the estate and moved in with his family. The family began hearing voices and seeing apparitions. Their dog "became nervous and high-strung". Hawkins shot a crazed dog that had attacked his wife. According to legend, the dog reappeared and the family heard a dog howling and scratching at the doors in the night. They moved out the next morning.

== Local legend ==
It is believed by some local residents that Redstone Castle is haunted by Alice Crawford Snow who was an actress, medium and spiritualist. In 1905 Crawford women, including Madame Crawford and Alice Crawford Snow, began leasing Redstone Castle for the summers and conducting seances. Madame Crawford was claimed to have made contact with her daughter Emma Crawford, of the local annual coffin races; Emma's coffin reputedly slid down Red Mountain after a rain. "In honor of their benevolent specter, Manitou Springs holds annual Coffin Races and a wake for Emma."

In 1910 Alice rented the home on her own to prepare for a role as Lady Macbeth in Denver. She dressed in costume and required others to call her Lady Macbeth. As her behavior became increasingly odd, visitors stopped coming to the home and merchants had a hard time finding delivery boys to bring supplies to her. While she lived at the castle, a friend rescued her during a suicide attempt where she had been shooting at ghosts and shot herself; Attempting to set another ghost on fire, she set fire to her bed clothes. Alice was treated at St. Francis Hospital in Colorado Springs. She left Manitou Springs "a bitter and despondent woman". Many believe her spirit lives on in the castle.
