= Crystal Valley Cemetery =

United States historic place in Manitou Springs, Colorado

- U.S. National Register of Historic Places
- Colorado State Register of Historic Properties No. 5EP167
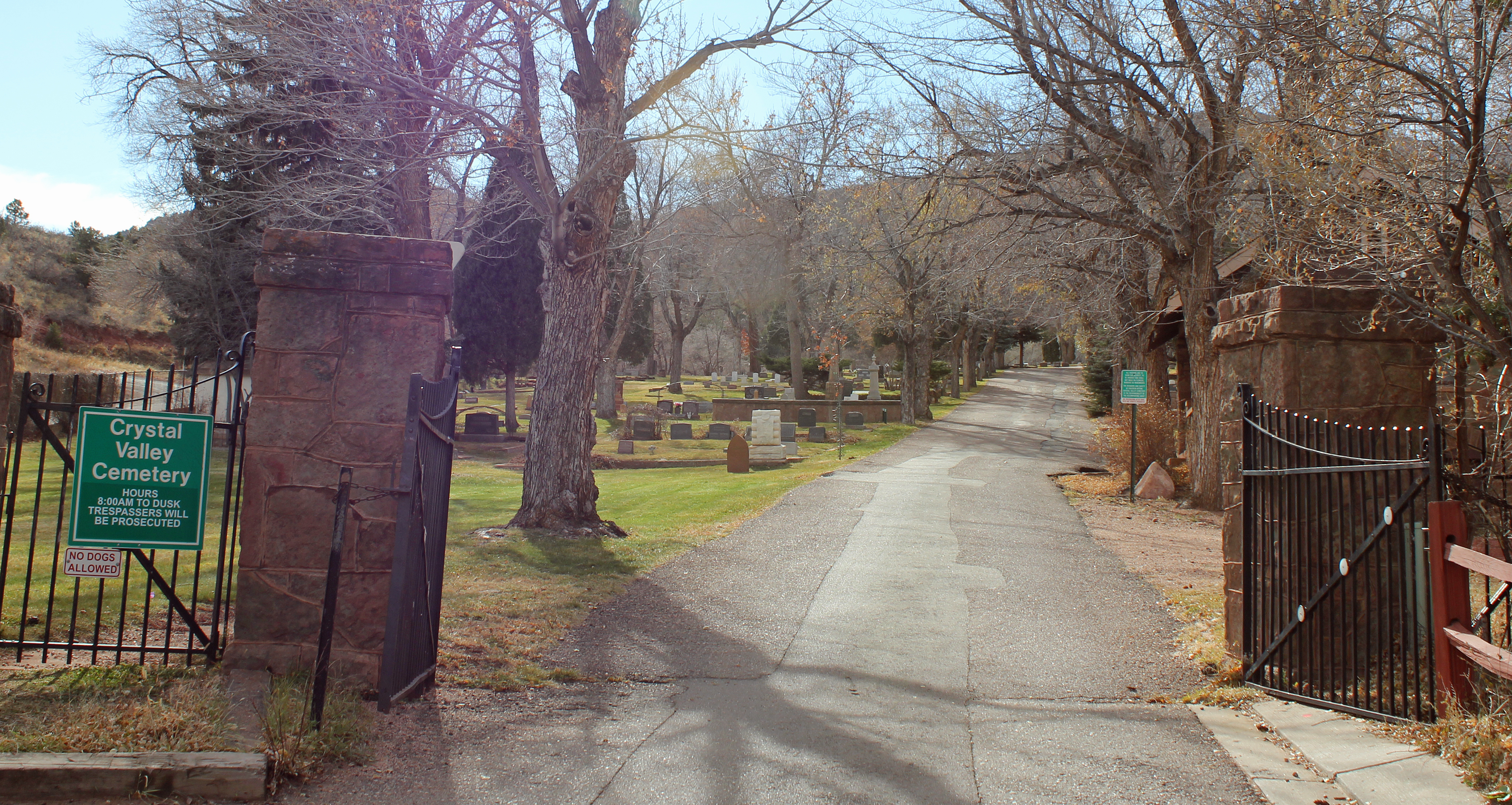

- Location within Colorado Location within the United States
- Location: Plainview Avenue, Manitou Springs, Colorado
- Coordinates: 38°51′6″N 104°54′11″W
- NRHP reference No.: 82001015
- CSRHP No.: 5EP167

Significant dates
- Added to NRHP: 1982
- Designated CSRHP: 1980

Crystal Valley Cemetery is a cemetery located on Plainview Place in Manitou Springs, Colorado. Since its establishment in 1882, it has been the principal cemetery in Manitou Springs. It is listed in the National Register of Historic Places.

== Overview ==
The land for the cemetery was provided by Dr. Isaac Davis in 1882 and the cemetery was laid out that year. (Note: The land for the cemetery is also claimed to have been purchased in the late 1880s.) In 1890, the cemetery was established and graves from the original town cemetery on Pawnee Avenue were moved to the new cemetery. Since its establishment, it has served as Manitou Springs's principal cemetery. It is maintained by the Manitou Springs Parks Department.

The cemetery lies within a valley, with several ridges, and its elevation increases to 6,600 feet (2,000 m). It is arranged "in curvilinear fashion", following the local topography, and combines natural vegetation and landscaping, including gardens of irises, lilies, and roses. Its streets are lined with pairs of conifers and silver maples.

Enclosure and retaining walls are made from locally quarried green sandstone. The same material is used for several of the cemetery's buildings, including the chapel and maintenance building.

Architectural styles include Picturesque, Rustic, and Egyptian Revival. The Richards Mausoleum, made of green sandstone, is described as "probably the purist [sic] example of Egyptian Revival architecture to be found in the state".

An unusual monument in the cemetery is that of Freddie Schnieder, who died in 1887 before he reached the age of 3. He "was laid to rest... beneath a Kinney cast iron grave fence designed to look like a child's bed. The round marble 'pillow' inscribed with Freddie's identification, and the cast iron tassels hanging from draped chains to suggest bed hangings provide additional visual interest."

== Historical significance ==
According to the Colorado Preservation Office, the cemetery is "significant for architecture, landscape architecture, and for the important local persons interred there." In 1982, it was added to the National Register of Historic Places.

== Tours ==
Tours of the cemetery are conducted in the summers by reservation through Miramont Castle: "The guests will be given an introduction to Victorian mourning, their beliefs and superstitions by the Lady in Black."

== Notable people ==
Charles Adams (1840–1885), was a Civil War general, Colorado Indian agent, and secretary to Territorial Governor Edward M. McCook.

Mabel Jane Willie, the first female mayor of Manitou Springs, is buried at the cemetery. Emma Crawford is interred at the cemetery. Every October coffin races are held in Manitou Springs in her name based upon the legend that her coffin slid down Red Mountain after a heavy rain. Another local legendary woman is Theresa M. Kenny (1859 Austria – 1943); She built and stuccoed her own mausoleum in the 1930s and enjoyed rocking a chair alongside her completed project.

== Gallery ==
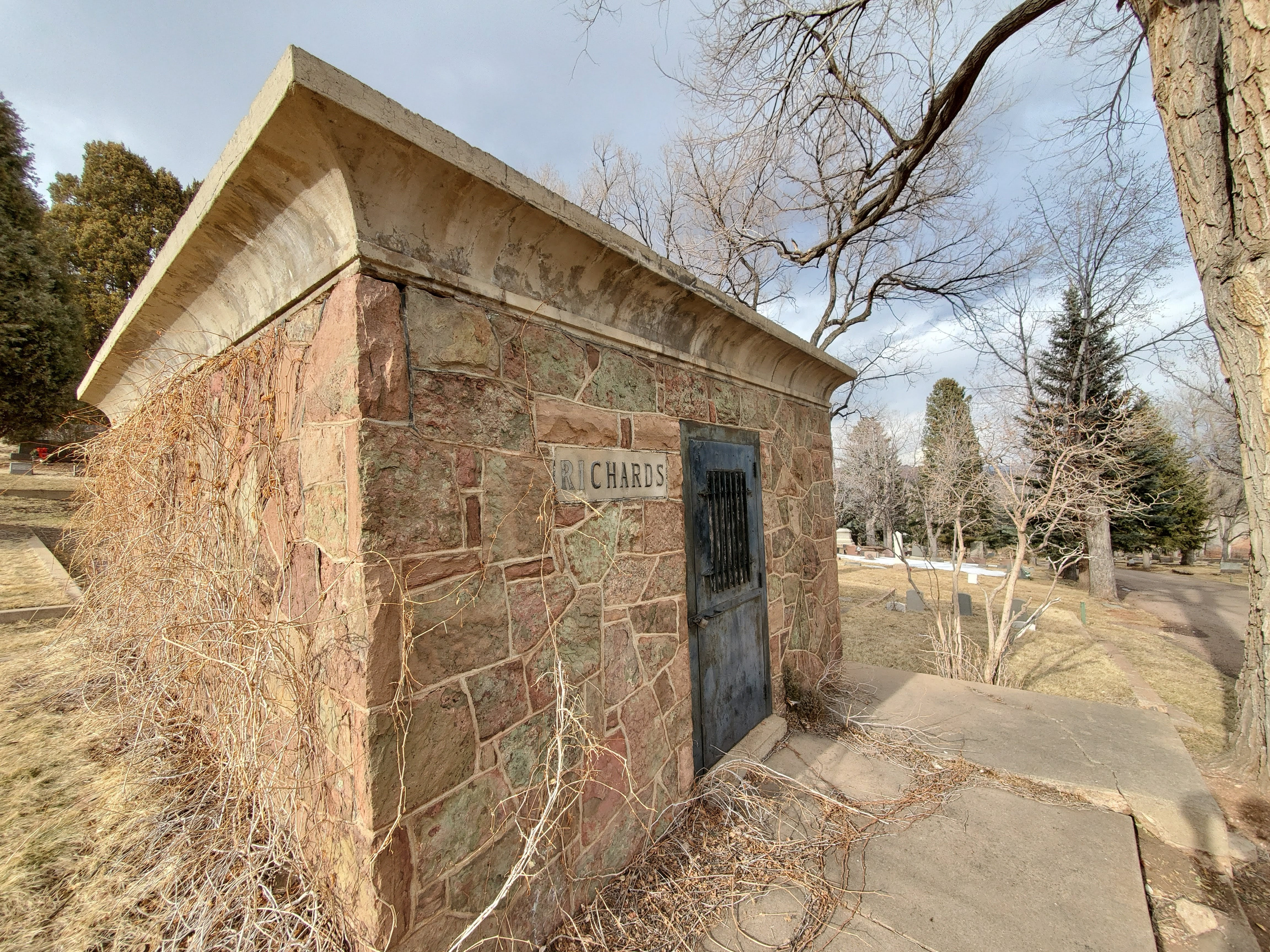
The Richards Mausoleum

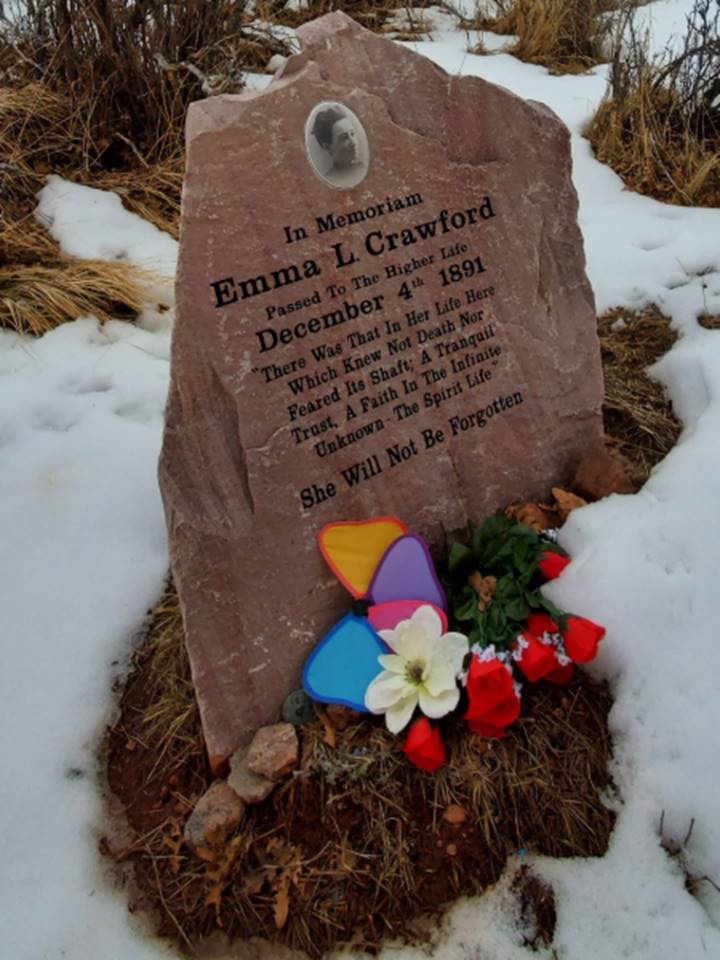
Emma Crawford's headstone

== See also ==
- Manitou Springs Historic District
- List of Manitou Springs Historic District buildings
