= Pram race =

Sporting event

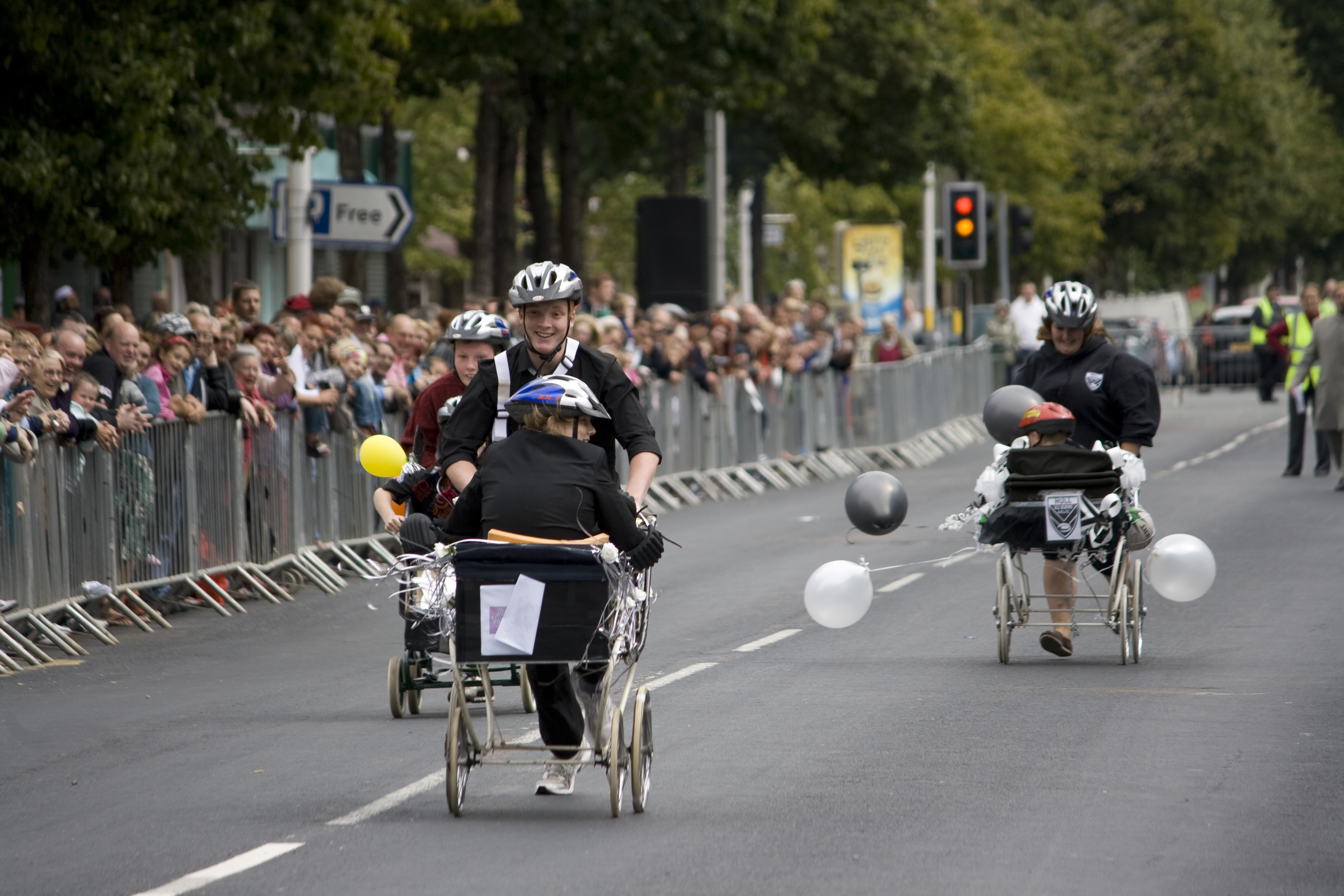
Pram race on Hessle Road, Hull

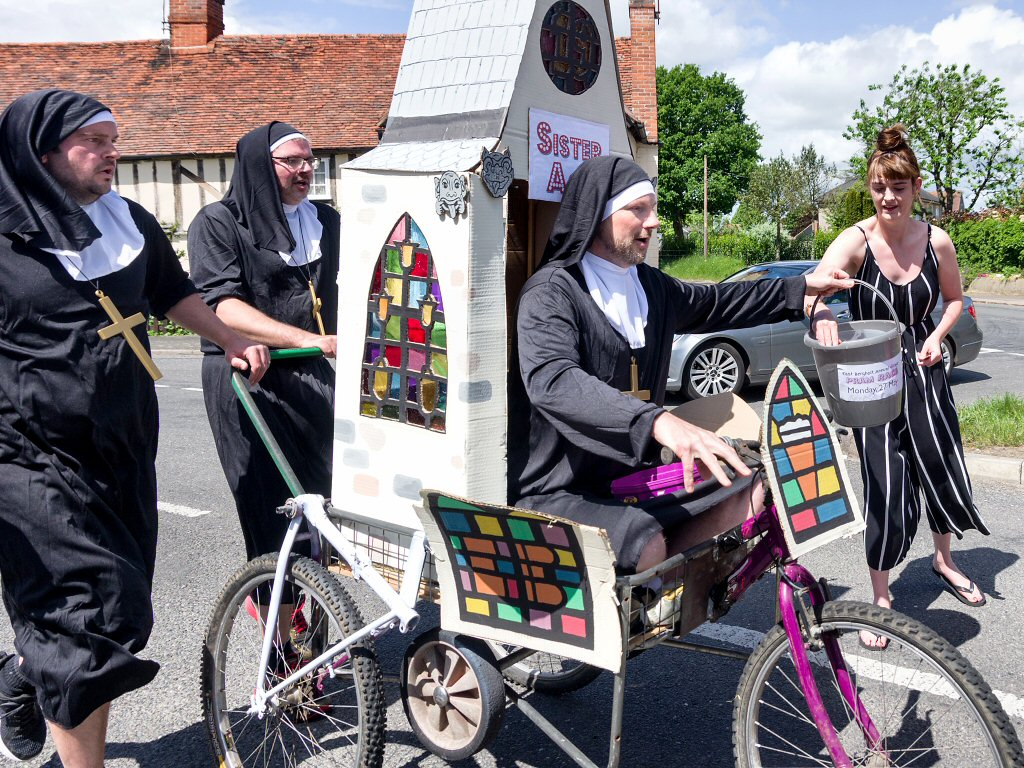
A costumed team at the East Bergholt Pram Race in 2019

A pram race is a light-hearted sporting event held in several towns in England, often to raise money for local charities. Small teams race an unpowered "pram" vehicle through the streets of their town, one member riding inside it while the others push. Vehicles are sometimes of an elaborate home-made design, with team members wearing costumes. The events often involve stopping for a drink at each of several local pubs along the route, as part of the race.

The concept of the pram race originated in Pagham in 1946. The race was established there by a group of demobilised military servicemen who performed a three-mile race around the town, stopping for a drink at each pub they passed, and competing to win a Christmas cake. From that year on, the race became an annual Boxing Day tradition in the town, with recent races having as many as sixty teams participating. The president of the Pagham event is racing driver Derek Bell.

Pram races have since become regular events in other English towns. The Dawlish pram race has been staged since 1972.

Rules for the Sutton Valence event specify that for a team of three, two runners must push while the other rides inside the pram, which must have four wheels, and the two pushers must maintain physical contact with both the pram and the ground at all times.

== See also ==
- Coffin races
- Gravity racer
