= Barker House (Manitou Springs, Colorado) =

- Barker House Private Apts.
- U.S. National Register of Historic Places
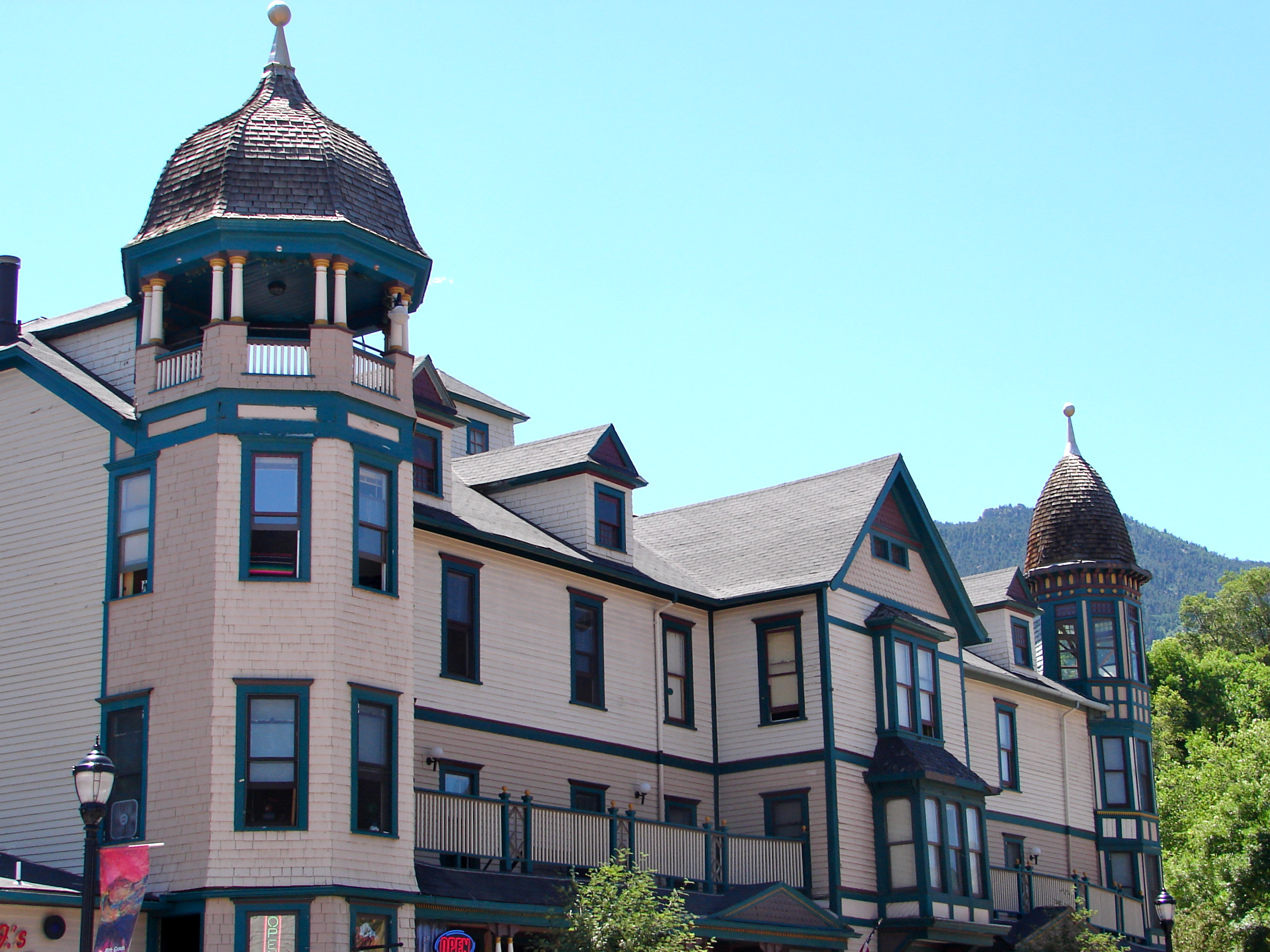
- Barker House Private Apts.

- Location within Colorado Location within the United States
- Location: 819 Manitou Avenue, Manitou Springs, Colorado
- Coordinates: 38°51′28″N 104°55′0″W
- Architectural style: Victorian
- NRHP reference No.: 79000604
- Added to NRHP: 1979

Barker House was once a hotel in Manitou Springs, Colorado in the Manitou Springs Historic District. It is a National Register of Historic Places listing.

== History ==
Charles Barker bought Pine Cottage in 1881 and built an extension and expanded it to the "Barker House". Barker was previously a manager and Manitou House schoolteacher. The Barker House is now a private, residential building, with 48 units. (Note: Manitou House was the first large hotel, built in 1872, across from Shoshone Springs.)
