= Cliff House (Manitou Springs, Colorado) =

- U.S. National Register of Historic Places
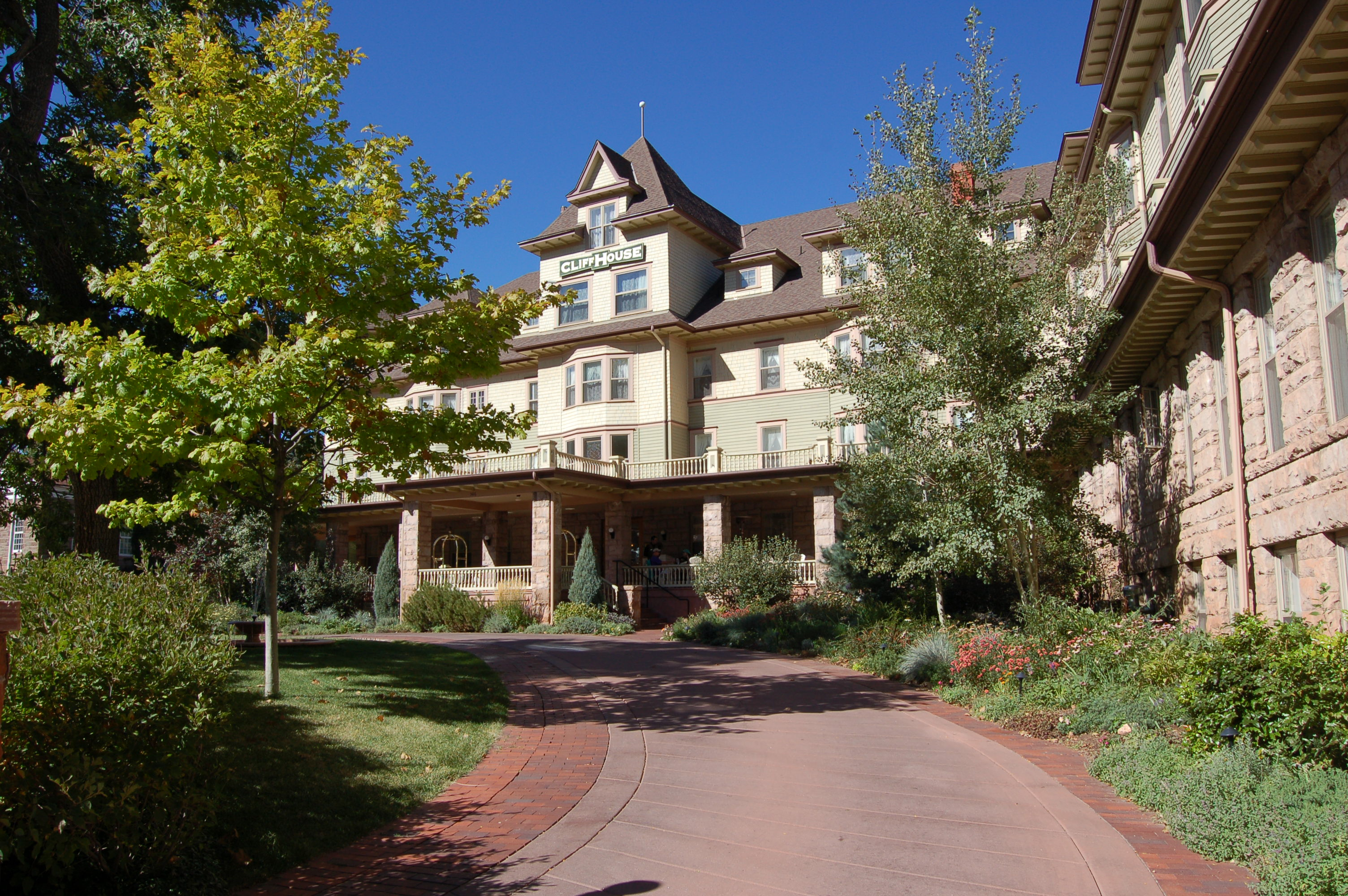

- Location within Colorado Location within the United States
- Location: 306 Canon Avenue, Manitou Springs, Colorado
- Coordinates: 38°51′34.77″N 104°55′2.56″W
- NRHP reference No.: 80000897
- Added to NRHP: 1980

Cliff House in Manitou Springs, Colorado is a Queen Anne style hotel in the Manitou Springs Historic District. It is a National Register of Historic Places listing. The Cliff House at Pikes Peak is a member of Historic Hotels of America, the official program of the National Trust for Historic Preservation.

== History ==
Mr. Webster and Mr. Shurtleff, entrepreneurs from Canada, provided the investment to build Cliff House, the second largest hotel in Manitou Springs in 1874. It is located near the Soda and Navajo Springs. Before its addition, sometime after 1874, the hotel could serve up to 100 people. (Note: The first was Manitou House, which was built in 1872 on the present grounds of Memorial Park, near the present Seven Minute Springs.)

The hotel, once a stagecoach stop, was visited by Clark Gable and Theodore Roosevelt.

== Gallery ==
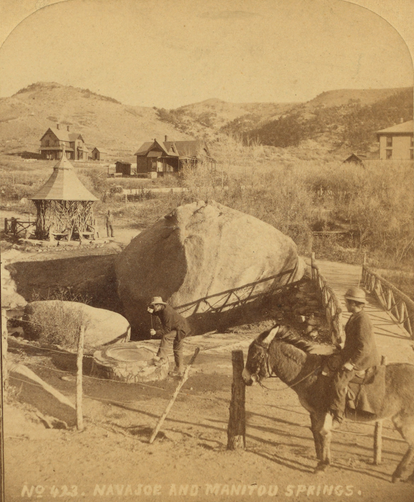
Navajo and Manitou springs, Colorado, from Robert N. Dennis collection of stereoscopic views. Cliff House is in the rightmost upper corner of the photograph.

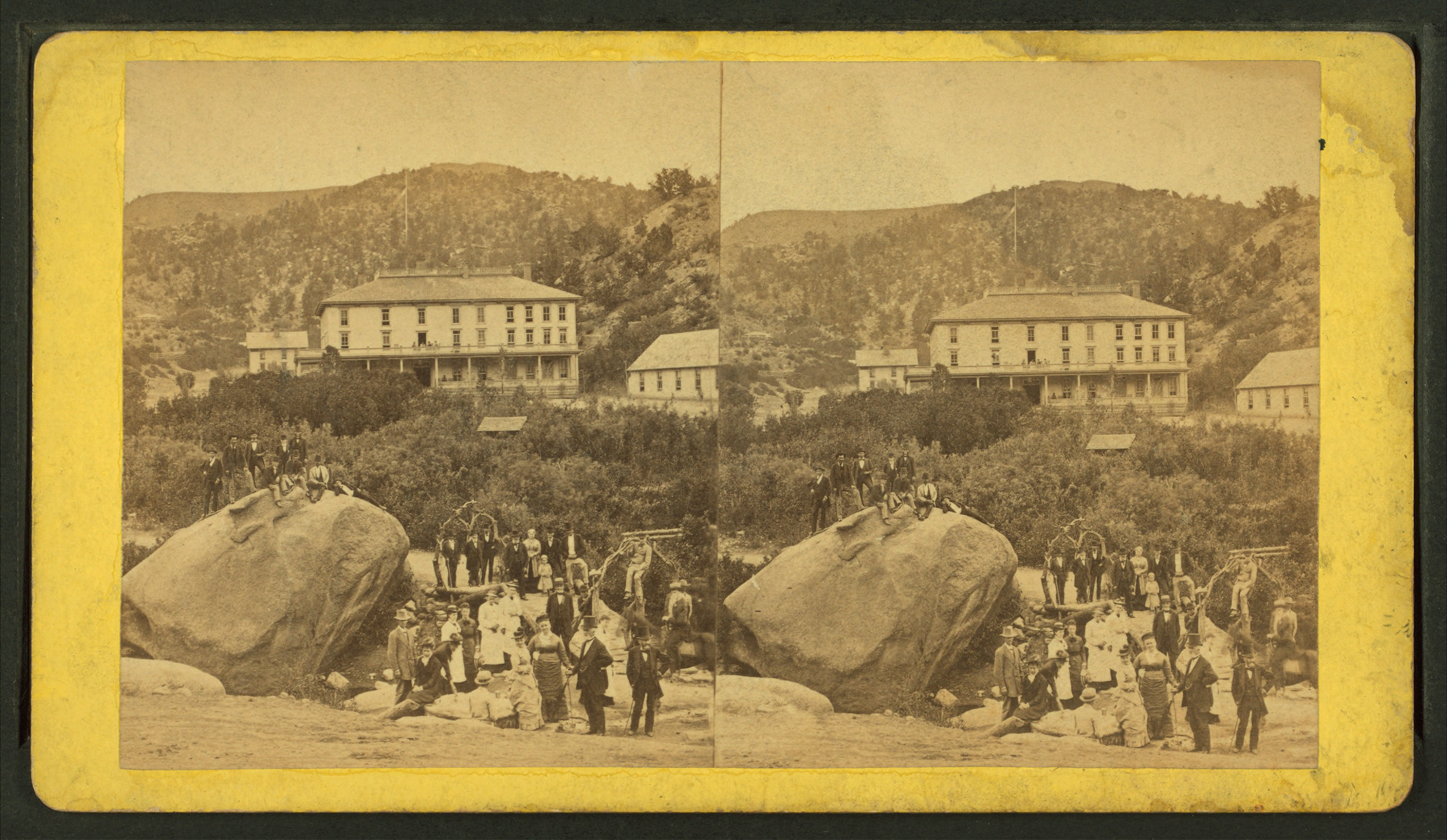
Cliff House, Manitou Park, Colorado, from Robert N. Dennis collection of stereoscopic views

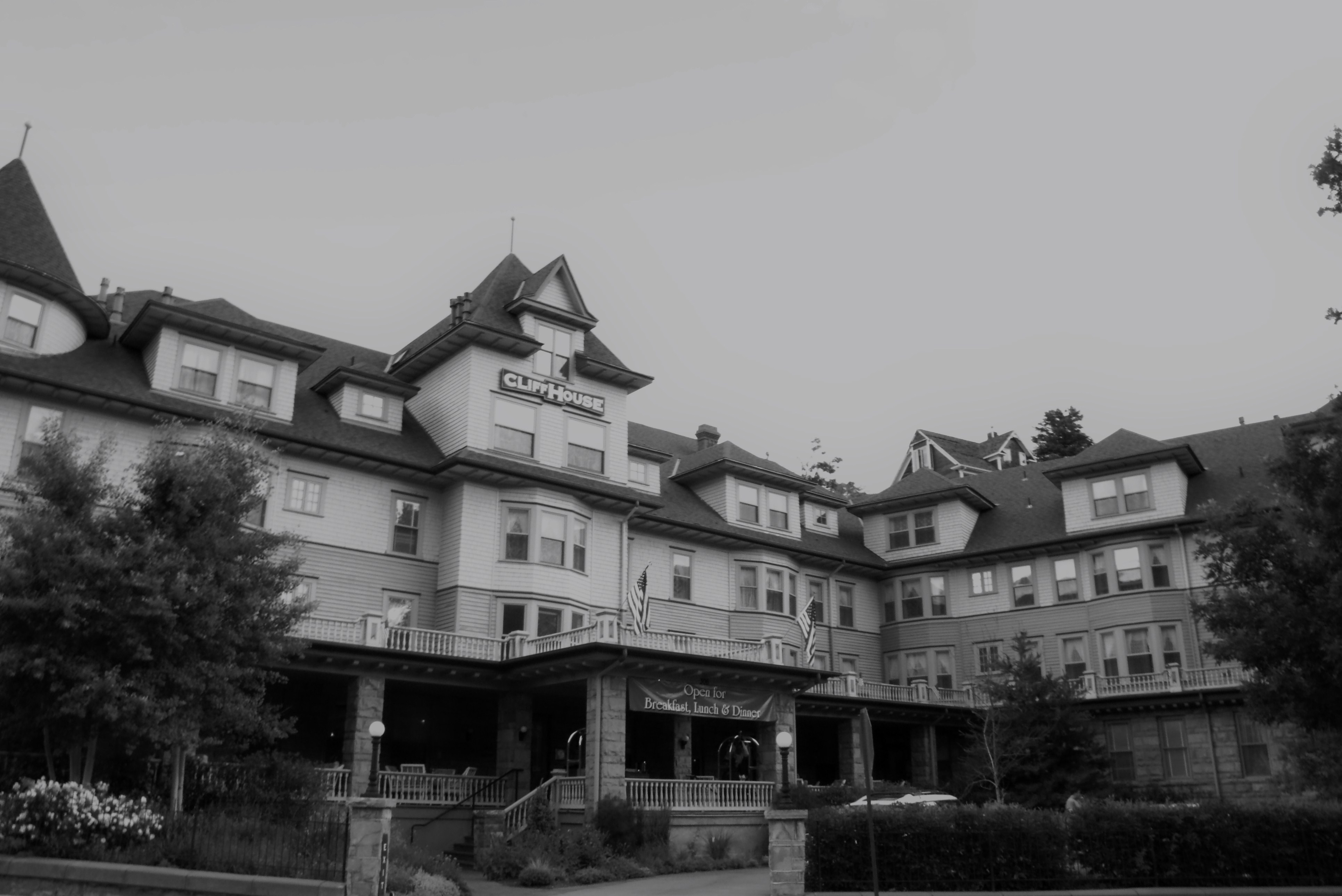

== See also ==
- List of Historic Hotels of America
