= Coffin races =

Humorous sport

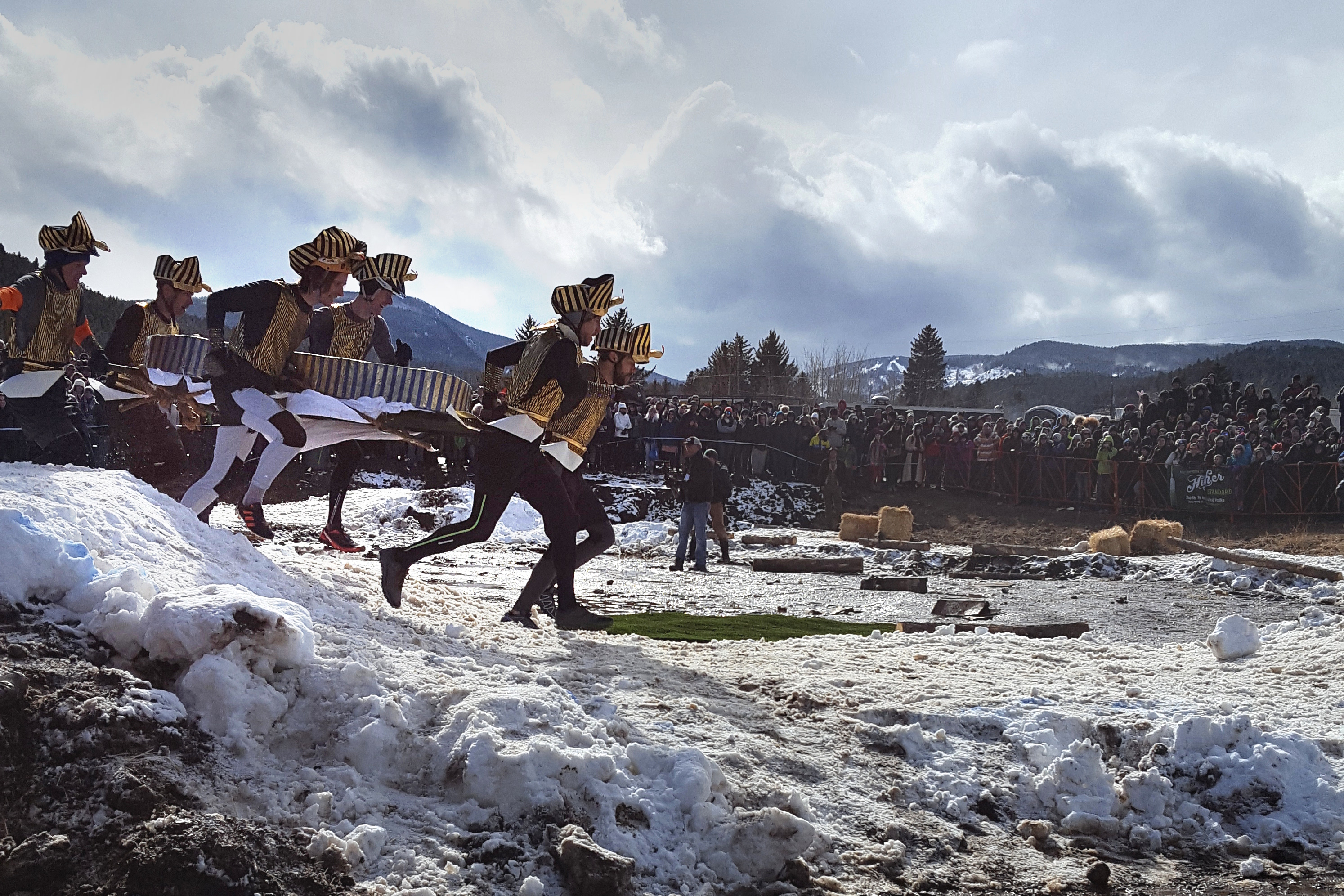
Team Fossil racing to victory - Frozen Dead Guy Days 2018

Coffin races or coffin racing is a humorous sport in which the contestants compete in delivering a coffin from start to finish; rules may vary.

== Emma Crawford Coffin Memorial Races ==
The town of Manitou Springs Colorado, USA decided "to put 'fun' into funeral" in 1994 while looking for ideas to boost tourism. The Emma Crawford Memorial Coffin Races were based on a local story of Emma Crawford, who wished to be buried at the top of Red Mountain. Her remains were later reburied on a slope due to construction by Louisville and Nashville Railroad Company. The slope eroded over time exposing the coffin which slid down into the canyon, where it was found and reburied at the Crystal Valley Cemetery. The Races are a full day event during the weekend close to Halloween, which, in part, includes the Emma Crawford Parade. The race itself involves a team of five: Emma and four "mourners", all costumed, who have to push their coffin 195 yards to the finish. The teams race in pairs down the street. In addition to 'Coffin Race Winner', participants are awarded for 'Best Emma', 'Best Entourage', and 'Best Coffin' during the Parade. In 2017, The Resurrection transpired and teams were also given the opportunity to compete for the vaunted Coffin Cup.

== Other places ==
The Frozen Dead Guy Days festival in Nederland, Colorado has been held in spring since 2002. In addition to coffin races, there are other unusual sports and contests, including turkey bowling, frozen salmon toss, Snowy Human Foosball, and frozen T-shirt and brain freeze contests.

Since October 2012, coffin races are part of the Denton's Days of The Dead Festival in Denton, Texas.

In Napa Valley, the Coffin Races, called "Rattled but not Shaken" are organized by the Napa City Firefighters Association. In 2015 there were four divisions: 5 to 15 years, Goblins; 15 to 30 years, Speed Demons; 30 years and over, Crypt Keepers, and a Women's division, Sirens.

In Gardnerville, Nevada the coffin races are called "Slaughterhouse Lane Coffin Race". It is held the second weekend of October and is organized by the Main Street Gardnerville program and its many volunteers. Halloweened themed vendors and activities throughout the day. You can find more information on the Main Street Gardnerville website calendar.

== The Coffin Cup ==
"12 Years ago, the Mani-Tu-Tu's took the Coffin Cup to Nederland's Frozen Dead Guy Days. The years went by...." In 2017, the Cup was Resurrected and at the 2017 Emma Crawford Coffin Race in Manitou Springs, Colorado, Team Fossil won The Coffin Cup and privilege of representing Manitou Springs at the 2018 Frozen Dead Guy Days coffin race in Nederland, CO.

The Coffin Cup is the travelling trophy given to the winner of the epic throw-down between Emma Crawford Coffin Racing teams in Manitou Springs and Frozen Dead Guy Days in Nederland, CO.

The Coffin Cup awards have not been without controversy. In 2017, Team Fossil was awarded The Coffin Cup despite being recorded with only the 4th best time by the Emma Crawford Coffin Race timing system. The team with the fastest time, "The Office", as well as the following two teams were not awarded The Coffin Cup because they did not give their consent prior to the race as was required.

=== Past Coffin Cup Winners ===
Year	Event	Winner	Loser
2005	Emma Crawford Coffin Race	Manitou Springs (Mani-Tu-Tu's)	Nederland (team unknown)
2017	Emma Crawford Coffin Race	Manitou Springs (Team Fossil)	n/a
2018	Frozen Dead Guy Days	Manitou Springs (Team Fossil)	Nederland (Nerds)

== See also ==
- Pram race
