= Miramont Castle =

- Miramont
- U.S. National Register of Historic Places
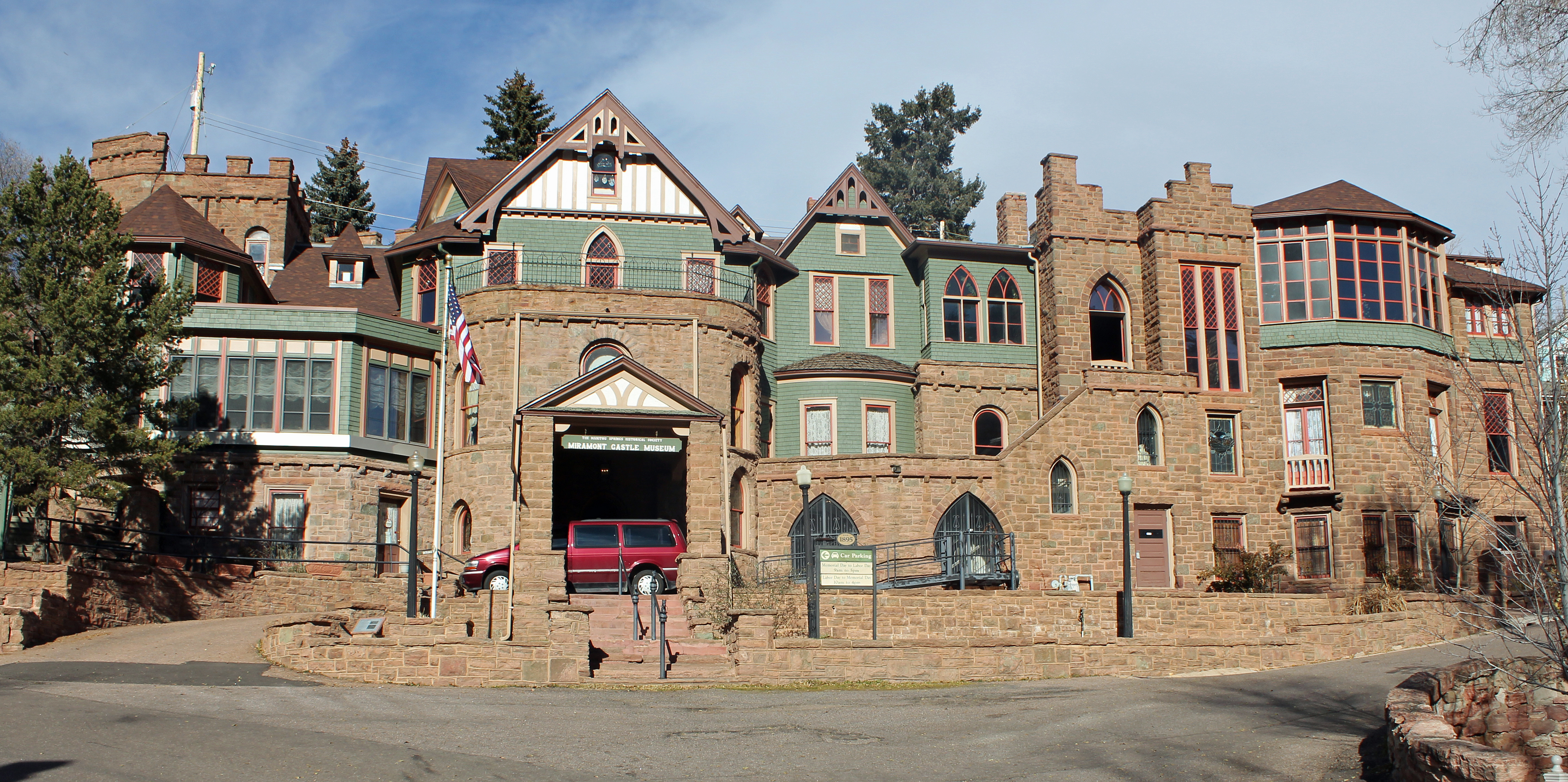
- Miramont, also known as Miramont Castle and Montcalm Castle

- Location within Colorado Location within the United States
- Location: 9 Capitol Hill, Manitou Springs, Colorado
- Coordinates: 38°51′33″N 104°55′19″W
- Website: Miramont Castle
- NRHP reference No.: 77000375
- Added to NRHP: April 11, 1977

Miramont Castle is a museum located in Manitou Springs, Colorado at the base of the Pike's Peak Cog Railway and infamous Manitou Incline. The Castle was originally built in 1895 as a private home for Father Jean Baptist Francolon, a French-born Catholic priest. Today, the castle serves as a historic house museum. Located in the Manitou Springs Historic District, it is a National Register of Historic Places listing.

== History ==
Father Francolon was born in France in 1854 into a wealthy aristocratic family. He immigrated to the United States in 1878 at the age of 24 after being recruited by Bishop Lamy of Santa Fe, New Mexico to serve as an assistant priest at the Cathedral of St. Francis of Assisi.

After moving around the southwestern United States for nine years to oversee mission churches for various Native American tribes and eighteen small chapels, Father Francolon returned to France for health reasons in late 1886. He would resume his parish duties in the United States a year later and continue into 1892.

To restore his failing health, Father Francolon relocated to Manitou Springs, Colorado in 1892. This area was known for its healing mineral mountain spring waters and clean air. His mother would join him in Manitou in July 1893.

The property is located on a parcel of land whose earliest deed dates back to 1862. The land was once owned by one of Colorado's most controversial men, Colonel John Chivington, commander of the infamous Sand Creek Massacre of 1864. Records show he sold the land in 1867 through his son-in-law who had power of attorney, but later filed a lawsuit claiming he had not given the power of attorney. Colonel Chivington would lose the lawsuit, and the land would move from The Colorado Springs Company from 1871-1882 until being sold to the City of Manitou.

Father Francolon had collected architectural ideas from his early years of travelling the world with his diplomat father, and would spend hours describing his plans in detail with his contractors. Construction began in the Fall of 1895, where the Manitou Springs Journal would report progress. Miramont gets its name by translating to "look at the mountain," a fitting name for Manitou Springs' mountain town feel. The castle was built with indoor plumbing and electricity.

Father Francolon and his mother were deemed recluse by the local community, despite their efforts to give back to the community by hosting two fundraising balls at the castle in 1897. Unexpectedly, the Francolons left Manitou in 1900, leaving behind their furniture to their beloved castle. Madam Francolon would return to France where she would pass away in 1907, and Father Francolon spent his final years in New York City where he would pass away in 1922.

The Miramont Castle was vacant from 1900 until 1904 when The Sisters of Mercy were urged to purchase it for use in conjunction with operation of their Montcalm Sanitarium. Father Francolon donated his first Manitou home for their use, mainly treating patients with tuberculosis, and receiving their first patients in 1895. After the original Montcalm Sanitarium burnt down in 1907, the Sisters moved their patients into Miramont, where they would serve for the next 20 years. Miramont became known as Montcalm Sanitarium during this time to keep the familiar name.

By 1928, it the sanitarium fell under economic pressure, and the Sisters used the building as a boarding, vacation, and retreat house before eventually vacating. It stood empty until it was sold to private owners in 1946.

Popular folklore has it that the castle is haunted with various apparitions and unexplained phenomenon as reported by visitors and staff.

== Architecture ==
Father Francolon incorporated all the features he liked into one castle. It features nine separate architectural styles randomly incorporated throughout the castle, including Shingle-style Queen Anne, Romanesque, English Tudor, Flemish stepped gables, domestic Elizabethan, Venetian Ogee, Byzantine, Moorish, and half-timber Chateau. Being perched on a mountainside, the front door is on the first level, and the back door is on the fourth, with the two floors in between also having at least one exit to level ground.

The castle is over 14,000 square feet, with most rooms being uniquely shaped to fit their purpose. Rarely was there a room with four square corners.

== Current ==
The house is now a Victorian-era historic house museum that is owned and operated by the Manitou Springs Historical Society. Visitors can tour 42 furnished rooms. The site also features a tea room, gift shop, and castle gardens. The castle can be reserved to host weddings and other occasions.
