= First Congregational Church (Manitou Springs, Colorado) =

Historic church in Colorado, United States

- U.S. National Register of Historic Places
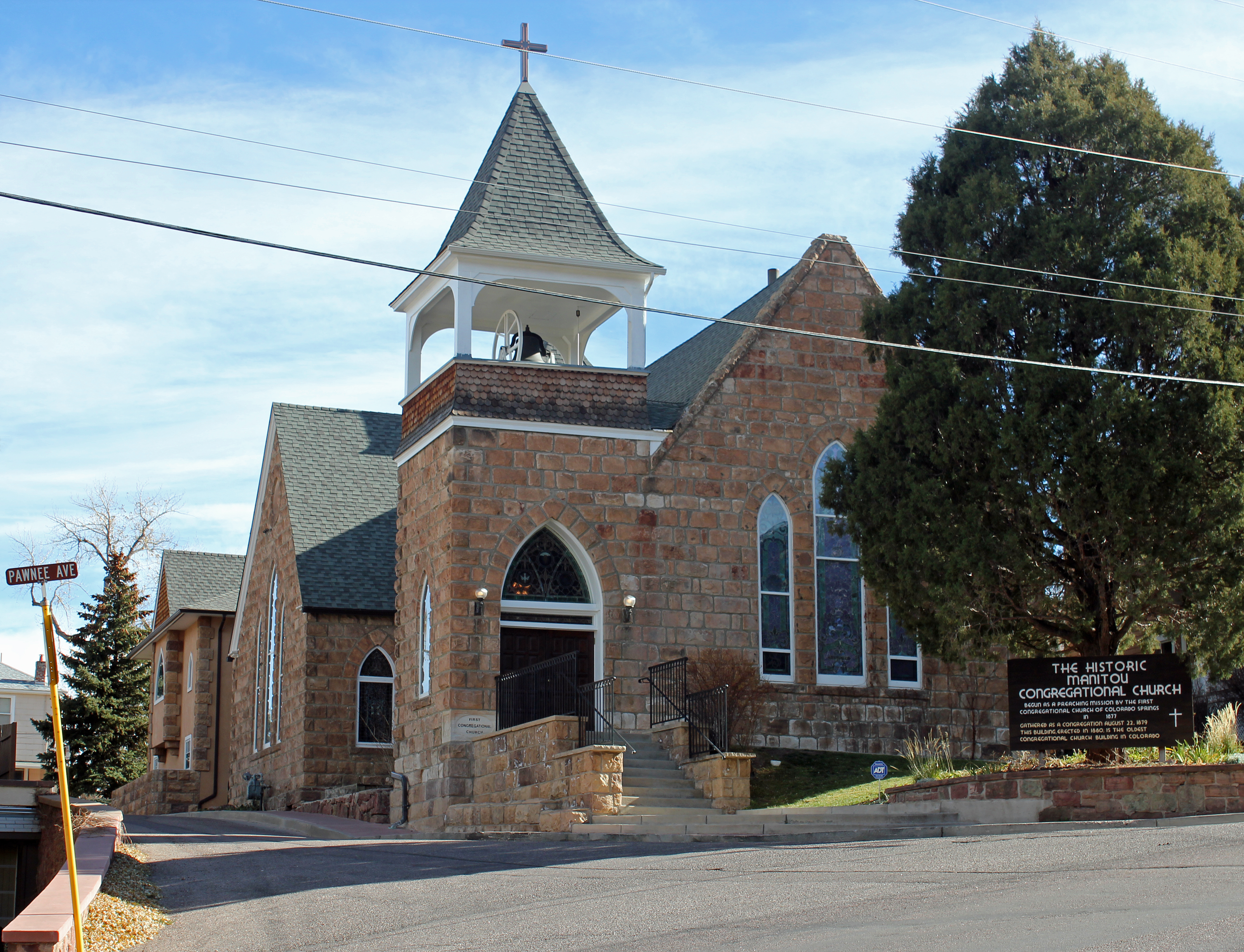

- Location within Colorado Location within the United States
- Location: 101 Pawnee Ave., Manitou Springs, Colorado
- Coordinates: 38°51′23″N 104°54′47″W
- Area: less than one acre
- Built: 1880
- Architect: Roeschlaub, Robert A.; Gillis & Snider
- Architectural style: Gothic
- NRHP reference No.: 79000606
- Added to NRHP: October 16, 1979

First Congregational Church (also called the Community Congregational Church) is a historic church at 101 Pawnee Avenue in Manitou Springs, Colorado. Completed in August 1880, it was the first church built in Manitou Springs and is the oldest continuously operated Congregational church in Colorado. Due to an influx of tourists during the summer, it was enlarged in 1891. It was added to the National Register of Historic Places in 1979.
