= Manitou Springs Historic District =

Historic district in Colorado, United States

- U.S. National Register of Historic Places
- U.S. Historic district
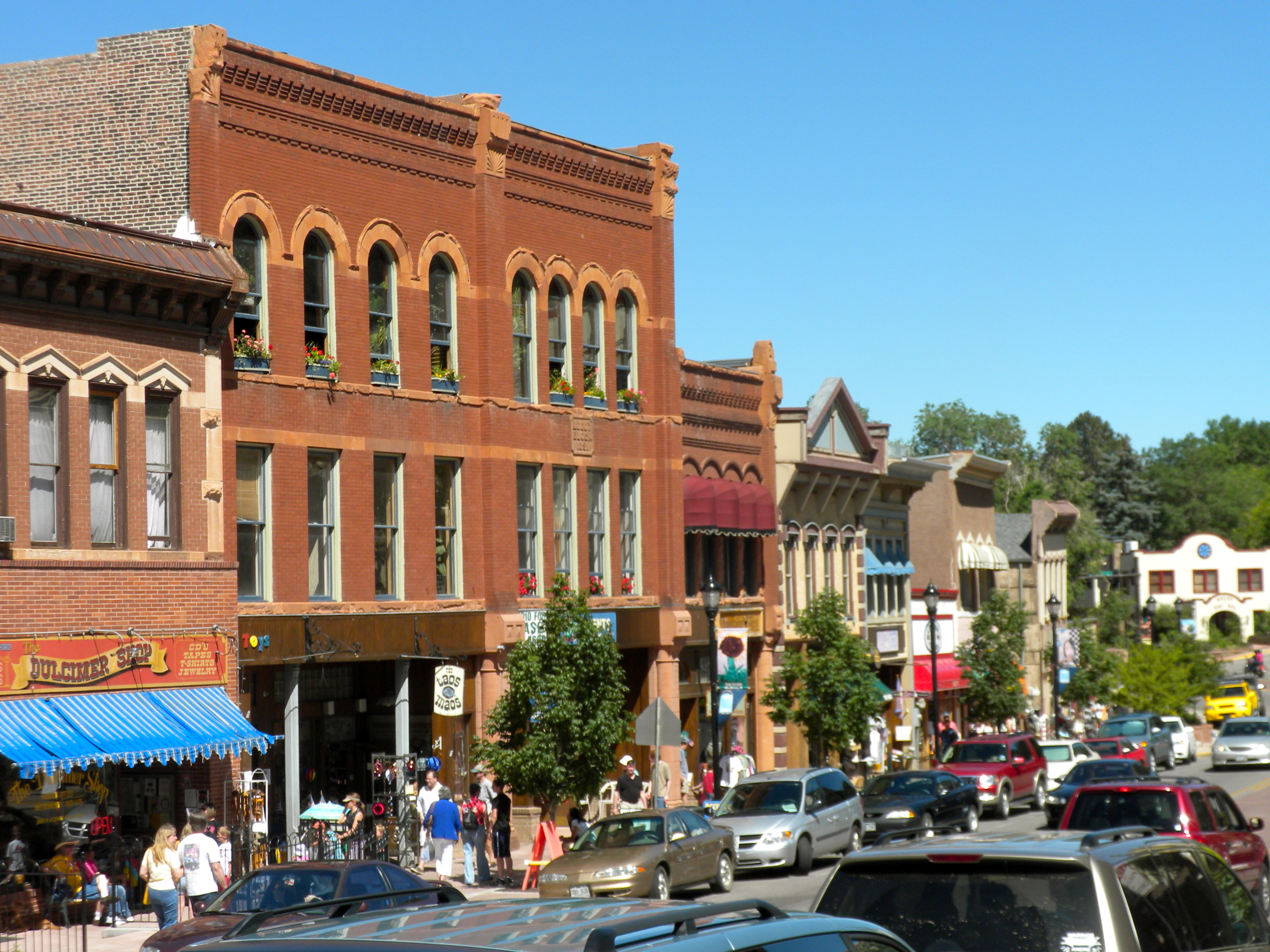
- 700 block of Manitou Avenue in the Manitou Springs Historic District.

- Location within Colorado Location within the United States
- Location: Manitou Springs, Colorado
- Coordinates: 38°51′28″N 104°55′14″W
- NRHP reference No.: 83003516
- Added to NRHP: 1983

Manitou Springs Historic District in Manitou Springs, Colorado is roughly bounded by US 24, Ruxton Avenue, El Paso Boulevard and Iron Mountain Avenue. Listed in the National Register of Historic Places, it is one of the country's largest National Historic Districts.

== Overview ==
Manitou Springs, also called "Saratoga of the West", was established as a resort community, known for its mineral springs and "spectacular setting" at the edge of the Rocky Mountains. The town is bordered by Mt. Manitou to the west, Red Mountain to the south, and Englemann Canyon to the south and west. It is near Garden of the Gods, with the same red stone as Red Mountain, and at the base of Pikes Peak.

Manitou Avenue is the main thoroughfare and location for most of the district's businesses. Some businesses are located on Ruxton Avenue and Canon Street. Residences are located along winding streets on hills that overlook the center of town.

The houses cling to the mountain slopes, sometimes creating a look of stacked boxes. The feeling close-up, on foot, or from a car, is often of a precarious and cramped context. Lacking flat land for lawns, Manitou is a town of decks, porches and stone-walled terraces.

Buildings in the historic district include homes, churches, the public library, hotels and lodges, the town's springs, Rainbow Falls and more. Homes are "picturesque" 19th century Victorian frame houses, Queen Anne homes, cottages, stone High style homes and cabins. Cliff House, with wide verandahs, is one of the historic resort hotels. In the 1870s, a Manitou contracting firm run by the Canadian Gillis Brothers imparted a "fundamentally British" flair to the Queen Anne cottages and the houses that they had built. Their cottages were replicas of Victorian houses on a smaller scale. Their projects included Miramont Castle, the Congregational Church and Leddy Block.

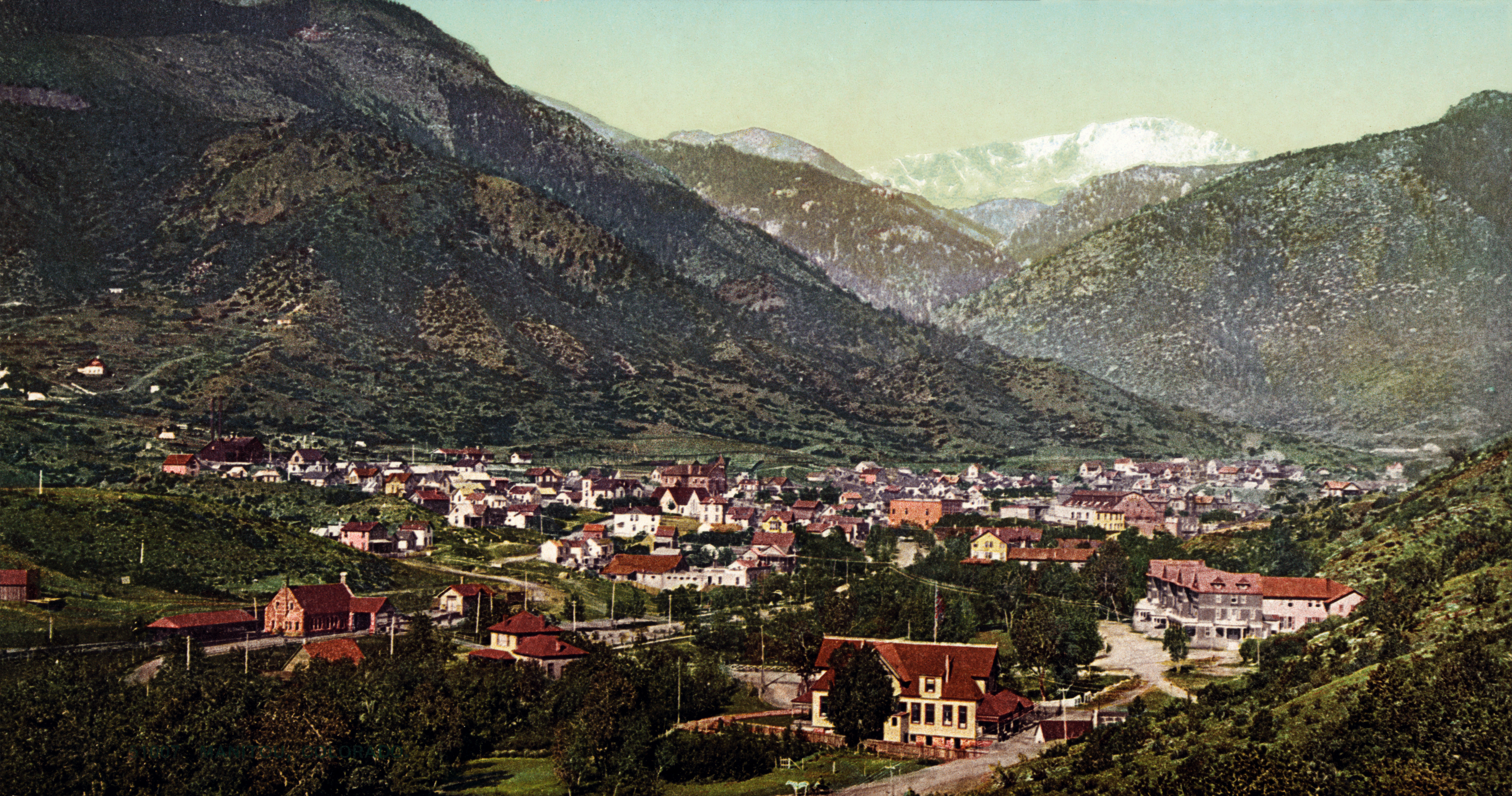
Manitou Springs, 1902

Manitou Springs maintains much of its 19th-century appearance due to its geographic location and the town's strong preservation efforts. The town developed within a tight valley surrounded by hillsides that are developed to their potential; There is no room for expansion. In addition, the town optimizes preservation of historical buildings. To a large extent, the 19th century homes and hotels are prevalent, although many have been renovated or expanded. Changes since the 19th century include loss of some commercial buildings and accommodation of automobile traffic and parking.

In 1979, Manitou Springs residents founded the Historic Preservation Commission to oversee "...the protection, enhancement and perpetuation of districts of historic and cultural significance and to instill and foster civic pride in the legacy and achievements of the past."

The following year the Manitou Springs Historic District was formed. In 1981 the commission administered their Design Review Guidelines. It has the "authority to review and approve, conditionally approve, or deny alterations to existing resources or new construction in the Historic District." Seven commissioners and up to three alternate commissioners are appointed by the City Council. In 1983, the district was added to the National Register of Historic Places.

== Natural springs ==
The town has several mineral springs, called manitou for the "breath of the Great Spirit Manitou" believed to have created the "effervescence" in the spring water. The springs were considered sacred grounds where Native Americans drank and soaked in the mineral water to replenish and heal themselves. There were 9 or 10 natural springs. As whites moved in there were "skirmishes" for access to the historical resort area until the Native Americans were removed from the area and placed on reservations.

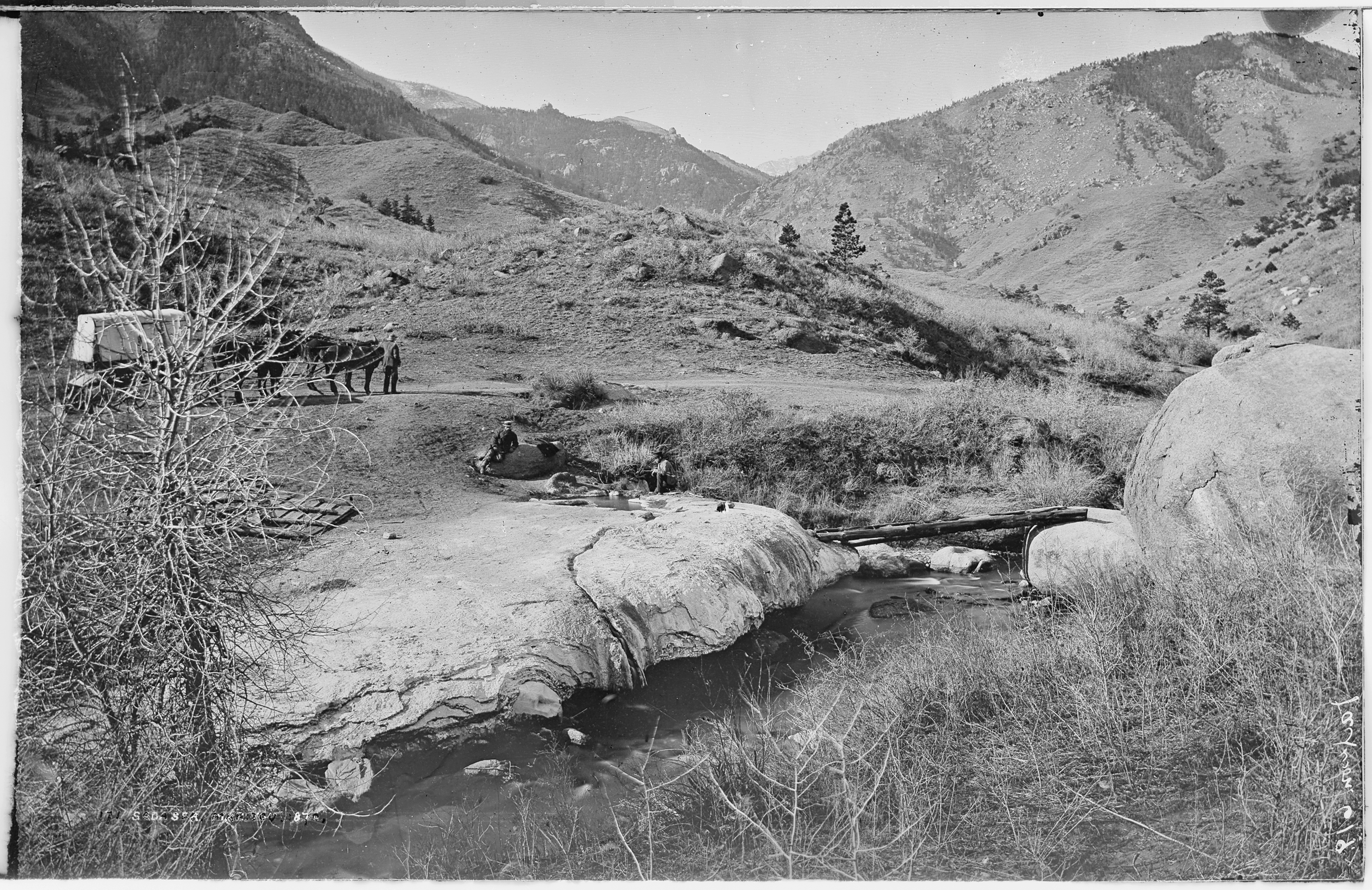
Soda spring, 1870

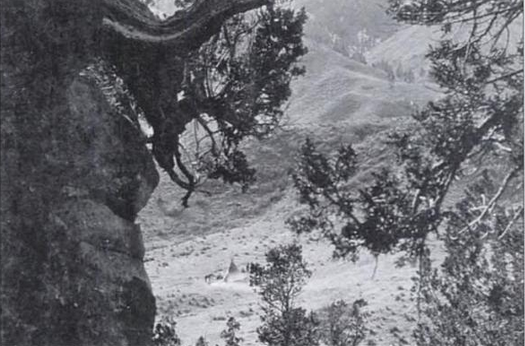
Valley of springs where Ute came to hunt and take the mineral springs. The center of the photograph shows a "lone encampment" of Ute Native Americans, between 1874 and 1879.

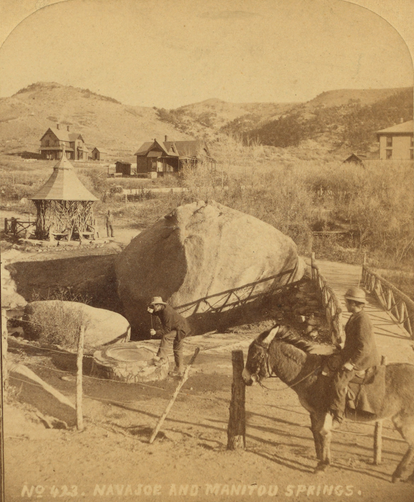
Navajo and Manitou springs, Colorado, from Robert N. Dennis collection of stereoscopic views

Explorer Stephen Harriman Long made note of the water's healing properties in 1820. George Frederick Ruxton also wrote of the "boiling waters" in a book about his travels.

Forty-eight years later, a plan for a health resort was developed by Dr. William Abraham Bell and William Jackson Palmer, a general during the American Civil War: "They had a vision of dreamy summer villas nestled in the mountains, with grand hotels and landscaped parks clustered around the springs." Railroad transportation brought people into the area, first called Fountain Colony and La Font. The town was not built as envisioned by the two men. Storefronts and homes were built in the town. It became the first resort town in the state. (Note: In addition to their development investments in Colorado Springs and Manitou Springs, Bell and Palmer invested in the Denver and Rio Grande Western Railroad to bring tourists to the towns of Colorado Springs and Manitou Springs from Denver. Bell, who was British, encouraged so many people from his homeland to visit the Pikes Peak area that Colorado Springs became known and "Little London". Horses and buggies at the railroad station in Colorado Springs transported visitors to Manitou Springs.)

In 1873 Henry McAllister, a developer working for Palmer, touted the medicinal benefits of the springs and that Manitou Springs had the necessary components of a successful spa resort, including "incomparable climate and scenery". The same year there was a financial panic which repressed the development of the town for nearly a decade. The town grew after 1881 with the creation of a railway spur that transported people from Colorado Springs to Manitou Springs.

Medical practitioners, such as Dr. Edwin Solly, promoted the health benefits of the "pure air" and sunny Rocky Mountain climate as the "world's best suited therapeutic environment" for the treatment of tuberculosis. He also believed in the benefits of mineral spring water which drew tourists and the infirm, particularly people with tuberculosis, to the area. Some springs were enclosed as the town grew. One of the enclosures, in red sandstone and under a "conical roofed structure", is the Cheyenne Spring House. There were more than 50 drilled wells and springs after the turn of the century. Since then, more were enclosed. After a period when the town's popularity diminished, some springs were closed, capped or paved over. Then the Mineral Springs Foundation was formed in 1987 to restore some of the springs and promote the benefits of the town's spring water. Walking tours of the town's springs are called "Springabouts". Manitou Springs water was sold "worldwide".

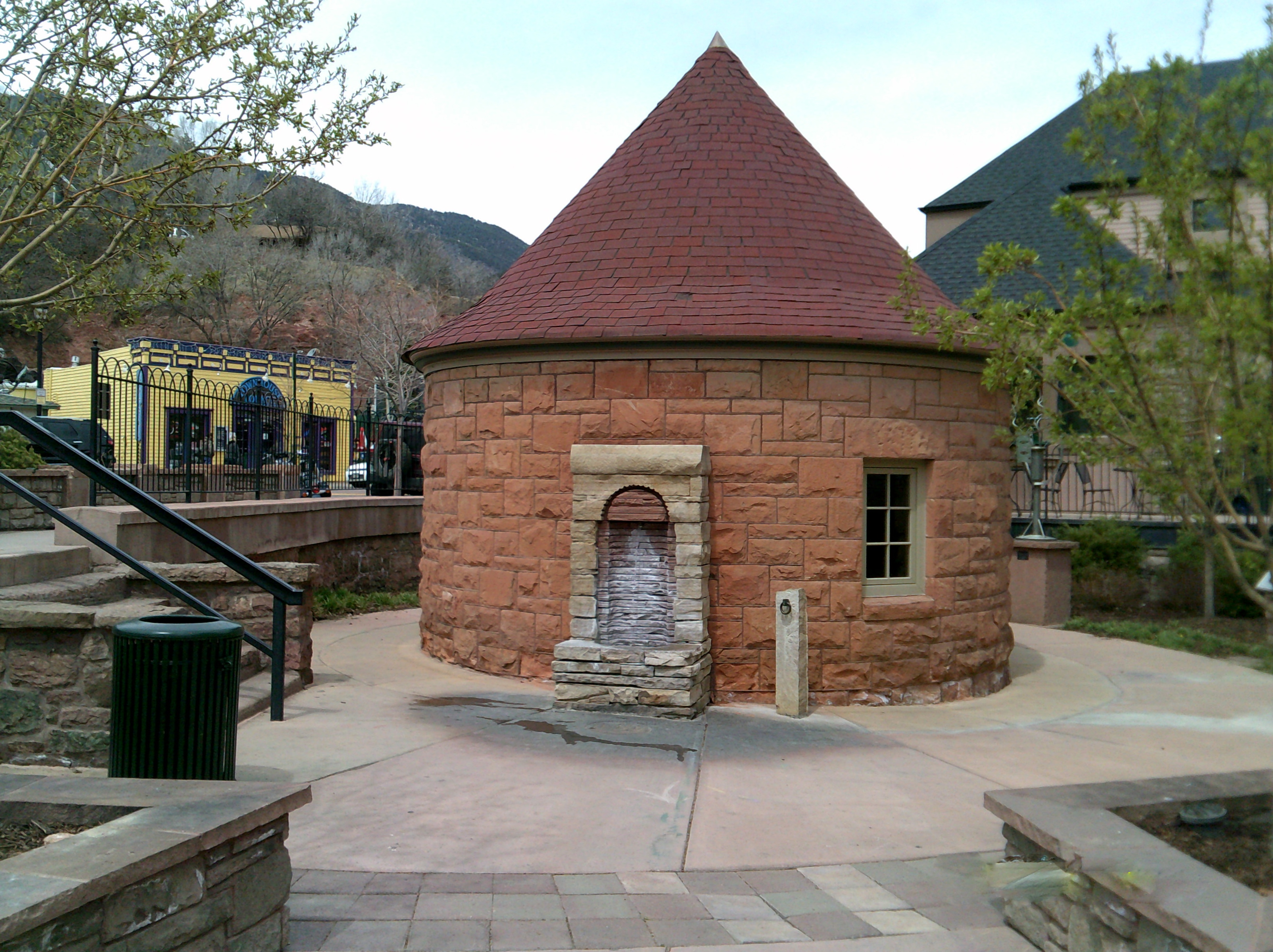
Shoshone Spring, Manitou Avenue

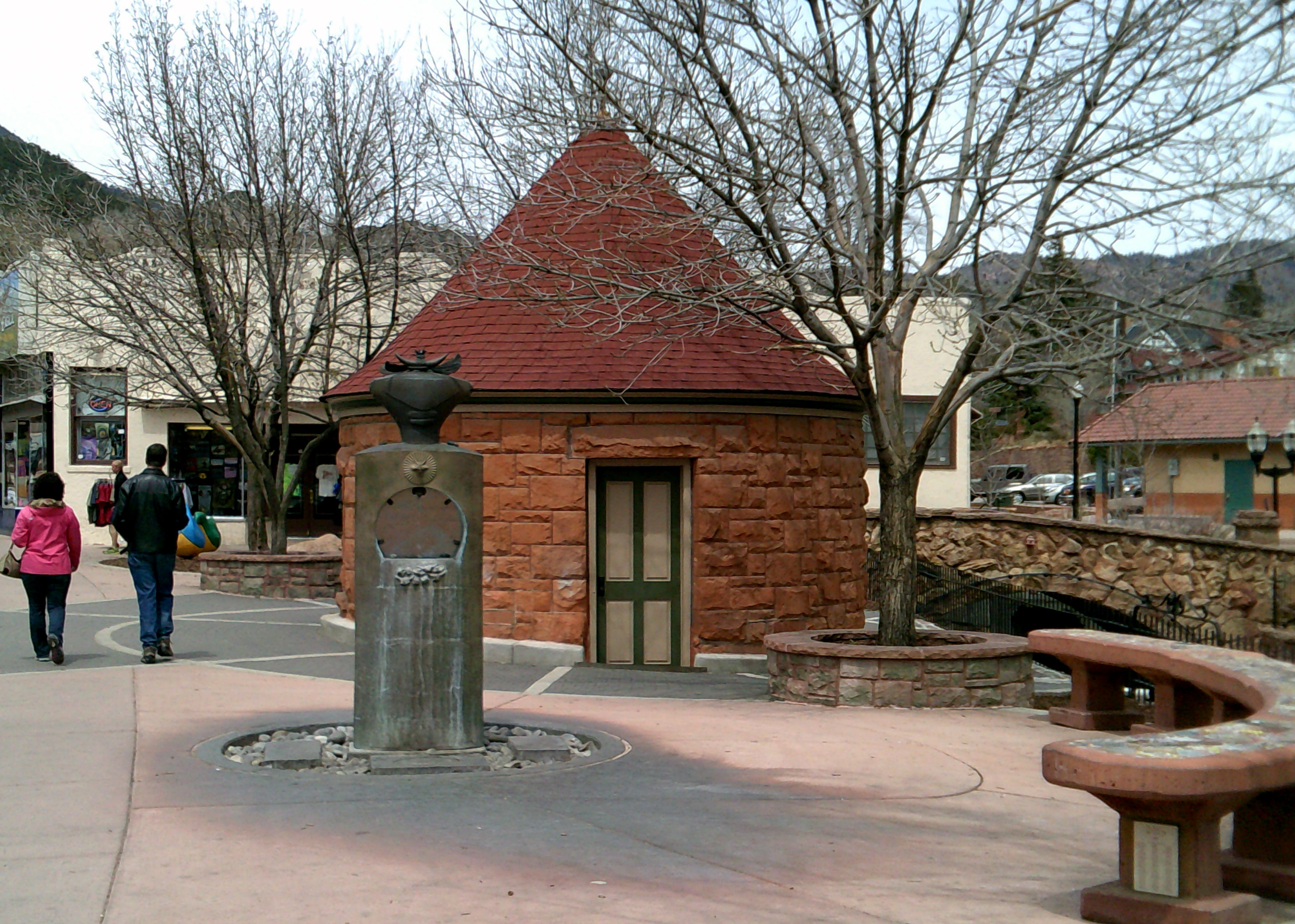
Cheyenne Spring House, Manitou Avenue

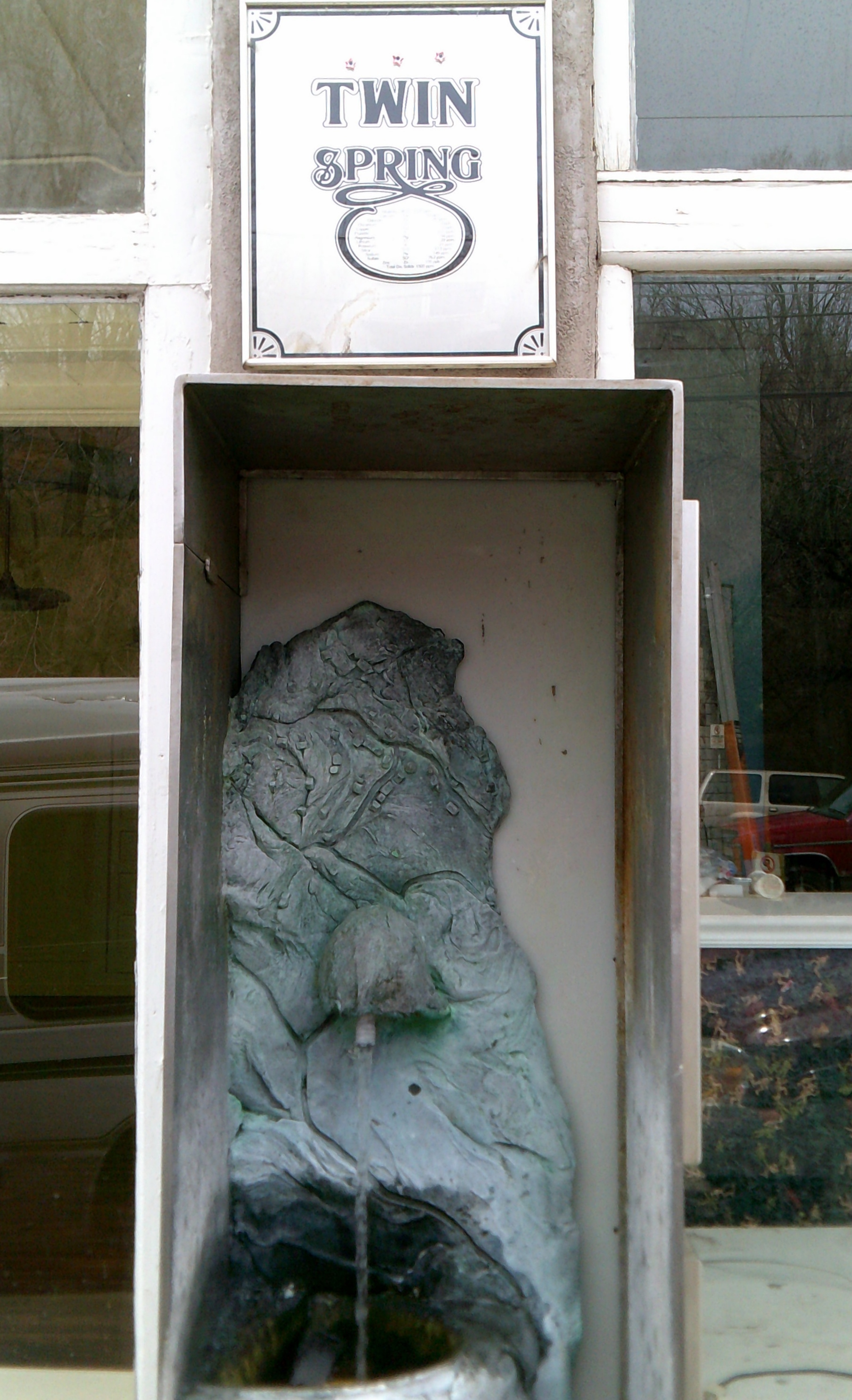
Twin Spring, Ruxton Avenue

== Churches ==
There are three churches in the historic district: St. Andrews Episcopal Church, First Congregationalist Church and Our Lady of Perpectual Help Catholic Church. The Congregational Church, believed to have been designed by Robert S. Roeschlaub, built of stone and ashlar, is located on 101 Pawnee Street. It was built in 1880 by the Gillis Brothers. The English Gothic Episcopal church at 808 Manitou Street, funded in part by William Bell and his wife, co-founders of the town, was built in 1905. H. A. Macomb was the architect. The Gothic Catholic Church on 218 Ruxton Street, is surrounded by walls and a cobblestone grotto; one access point to the church is a bridge that crosses over Ruxton Creek.

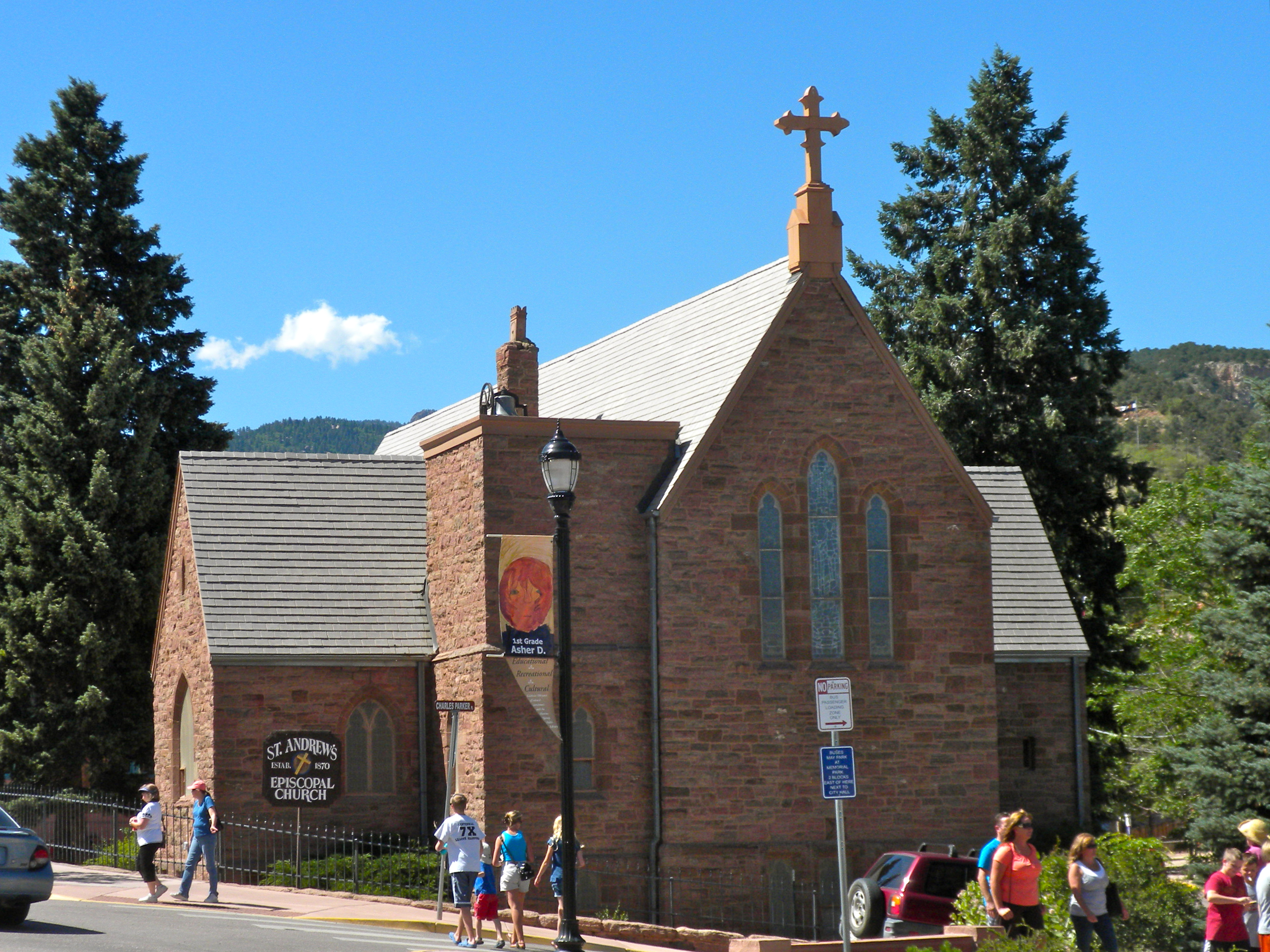
St Andrews Episcopal Church, 808 Manitou

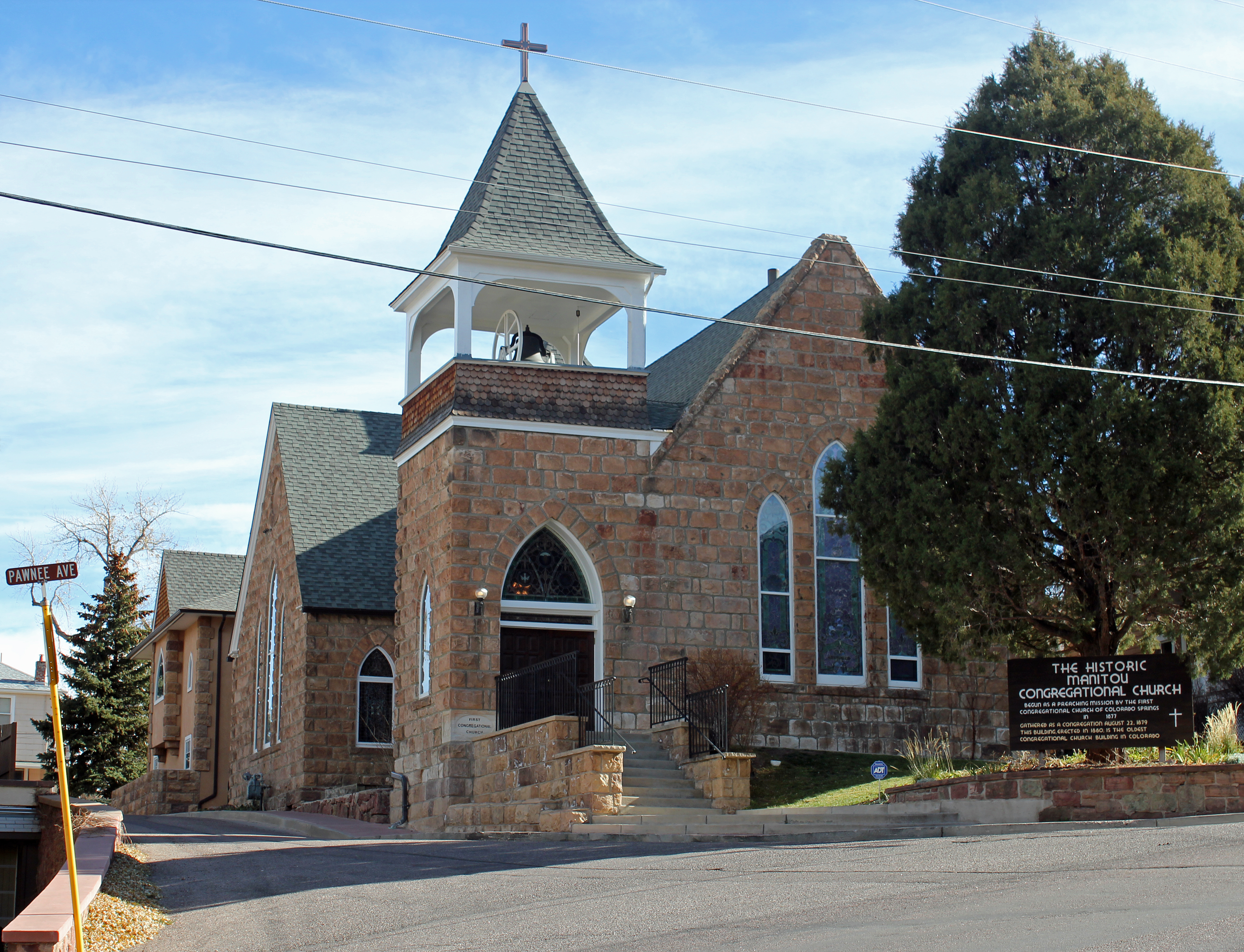
First Congregationalist Church, 101 Pawnee Avenue

== Hotels and motels ==
Current hotels/Inns include the Craftwood Inn, Cliff House, McLaughlin Family Lodge and Sunnyside Hotel.

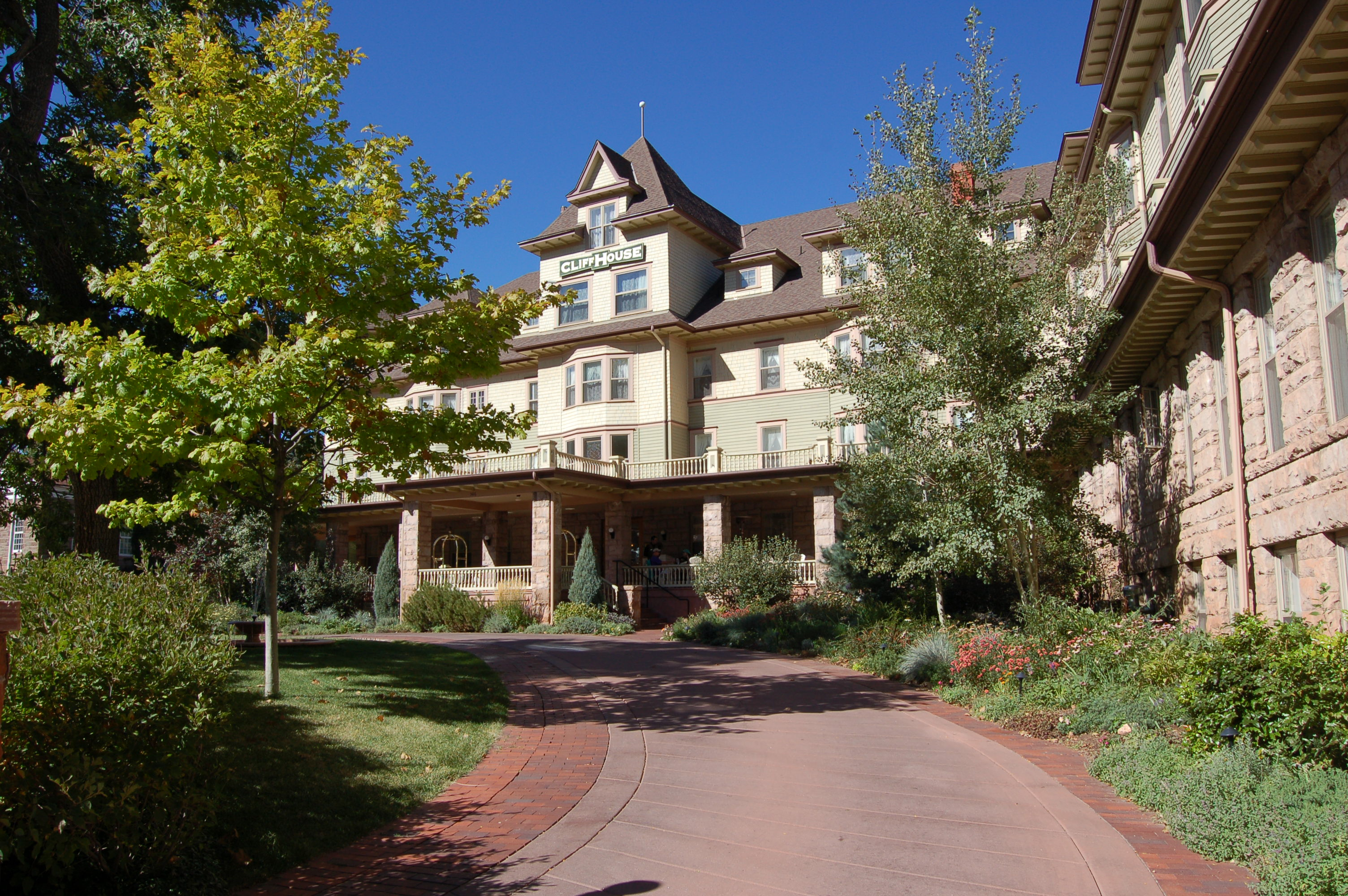
Cliff House, 306 Canon Avenue, built in 1874, was the second large hotel in Manitou Springs. (Note: The first was Manitou House, which was built in 1872 on the present grounds of Memorial Park, near the present Seven Minute Springs.)

Sunnyside Hotel, which was located on Pawnee Street, began as a cottage and was expanded over time.

As people began to take vacations by automobile, their lodging requirements changed. El Colorado is an example of a motel that was built for parking and access convenience.

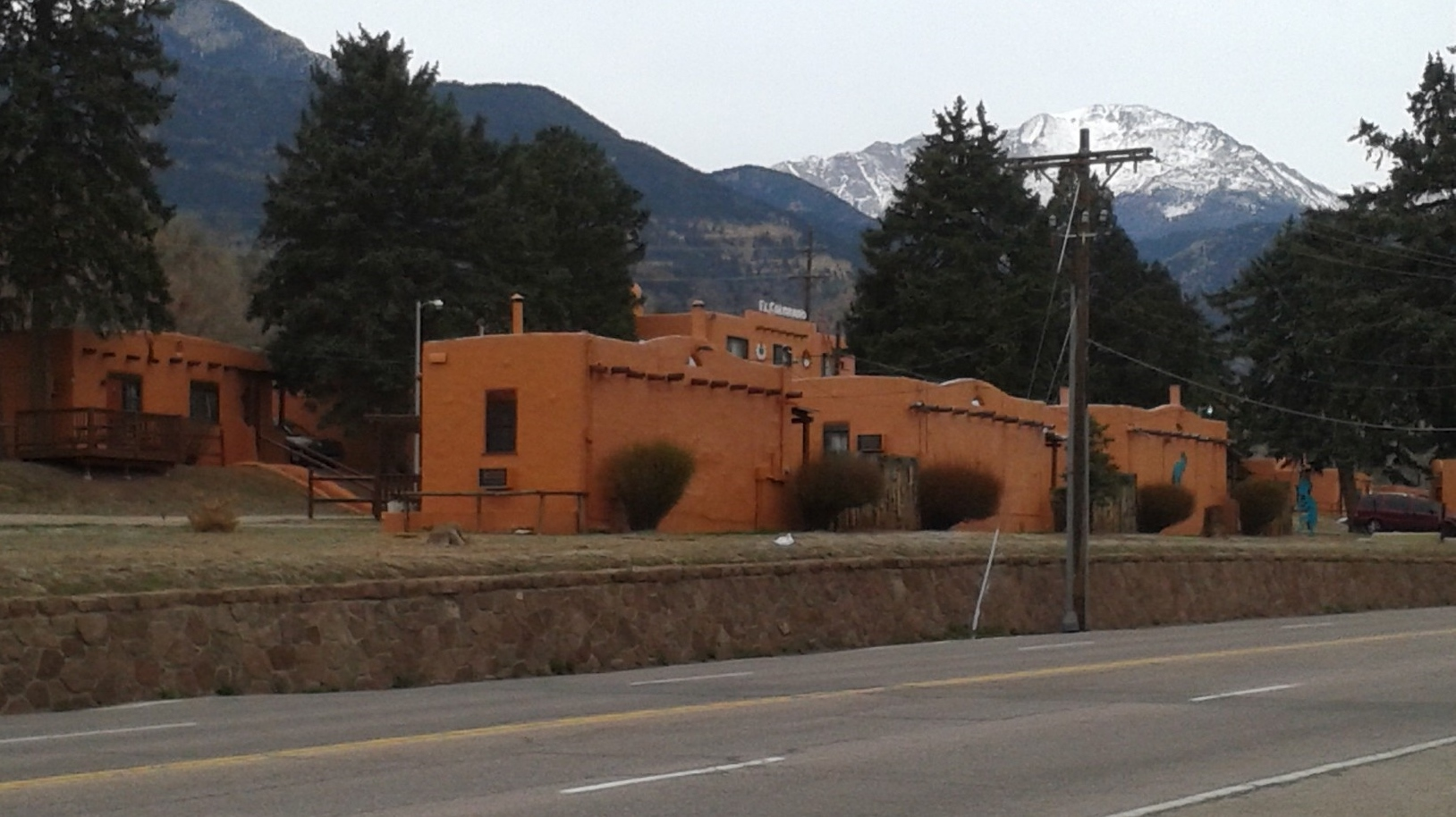
El Colorado Lodge

== High style buildings ==
=== Inns ===
El Paso Boulevard is home to several "High style" houses, which are now inns. One is Red Crags, a red sandstone building built about 1890s, which is "dramatically sited on a slope". It is at 302 El Paso. Next are Rockledge Country Inn and Onaledge Bed and Breakfast at 328 El Paso. Both buildings were designed in 1913; are Elizabethan architecture with stucco, stone and wood; and have stone walls. Craftwood Inn, at 404 El Paso, is also Elizabethan with clipped gables.

=== Homes and museum ===
Aside from the "High style" houses that have become inns, there are a few others that are traditional residences. Nolan House and Redstone Castle are Queen Anne architecture, both with prominent turrets. Miramont Castle is an eclectic mix of architectural styles, but primarily Queen Anne. There are five other High style houses in the Manitou Springs Historic District; Several are Shingles style, but there are also Second Empire, chalet, a mixture of styles and a Pueblo type house.

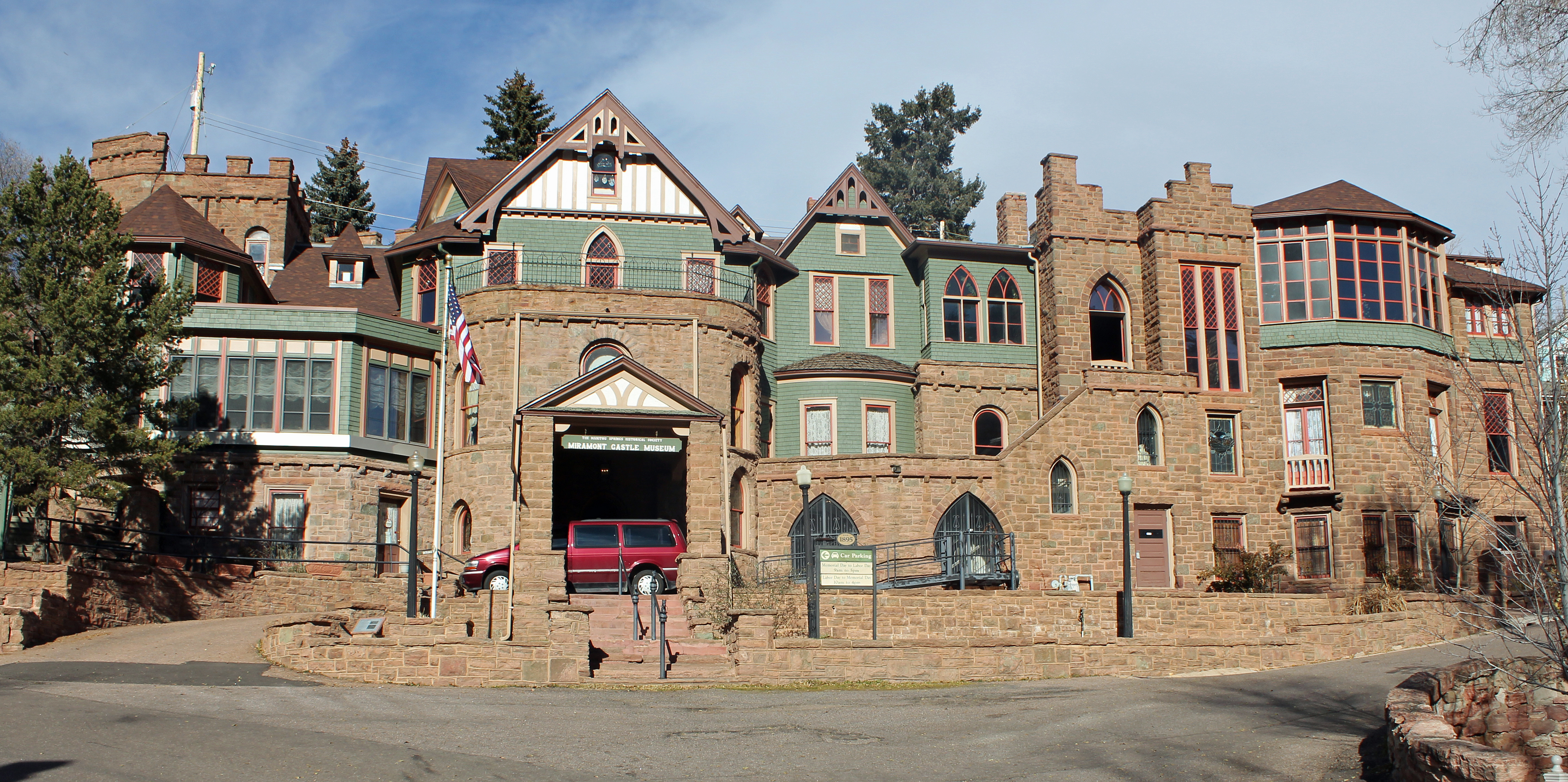
Miramont Castle

== Commercial ==
Manitou Springs's historic district was built in the 19th century. Historic preservation has made for "quaint boutiques", galleries and restaurants.

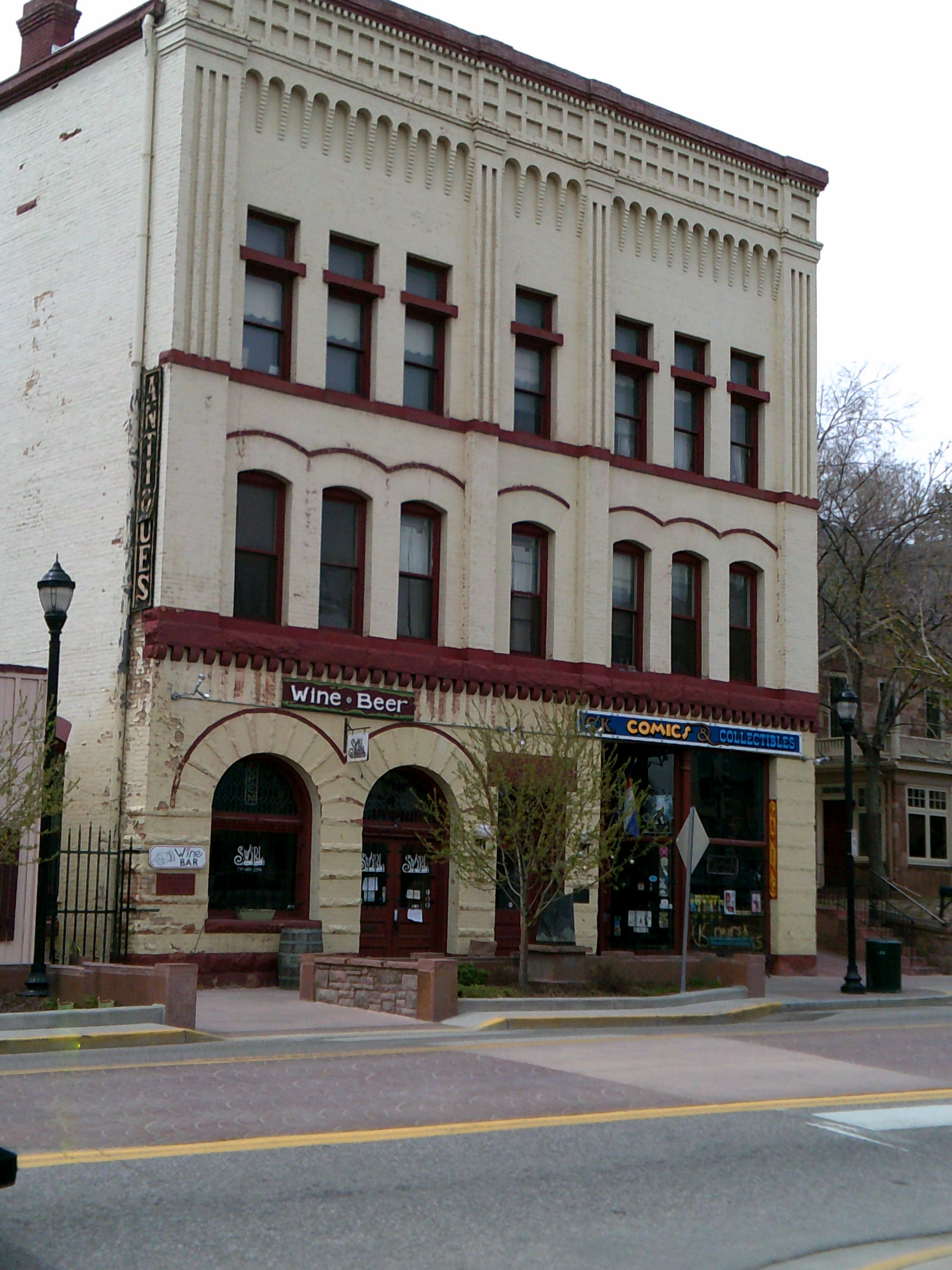
Wheeler Bank 717-719 Manitou Avenue

== Industrial ==
- Manitou Incline
- Midland Terminal Railway
- Midland Railroad
- Cog Railroad

== Other ==
- Stone bridge over Fountain Creek in Memorial Park

== Gallery ==
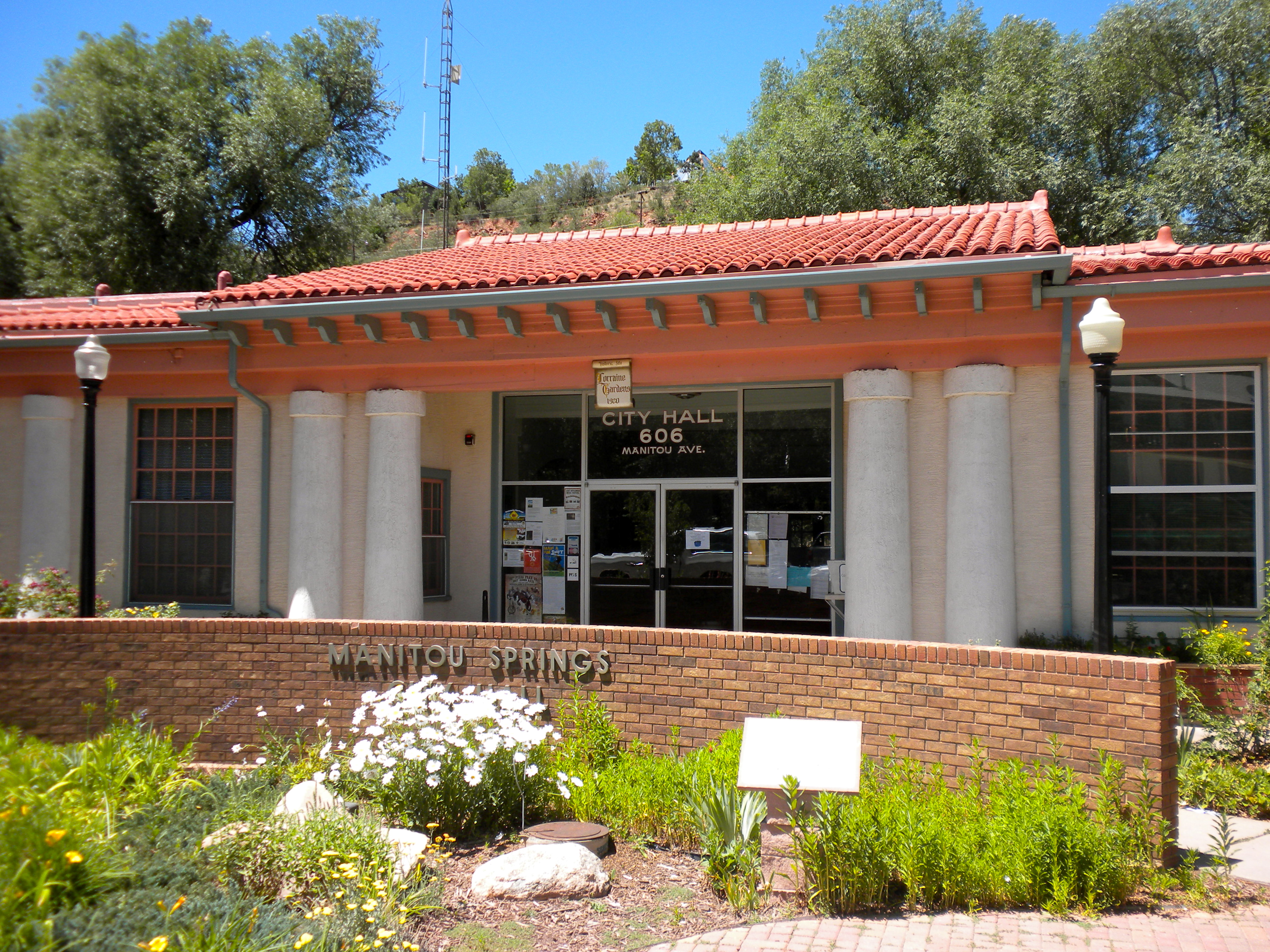
Manitou Springs City Hall

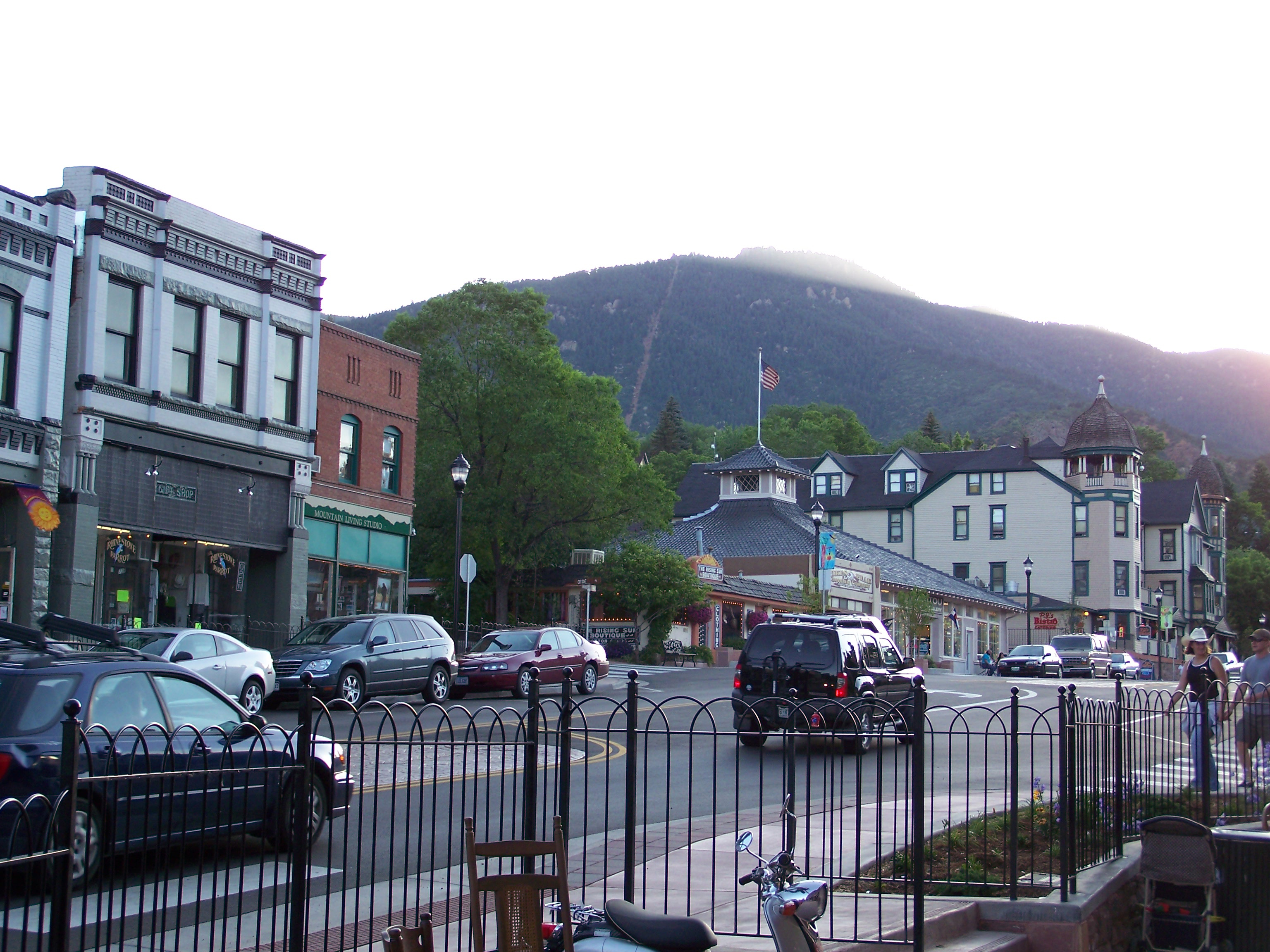

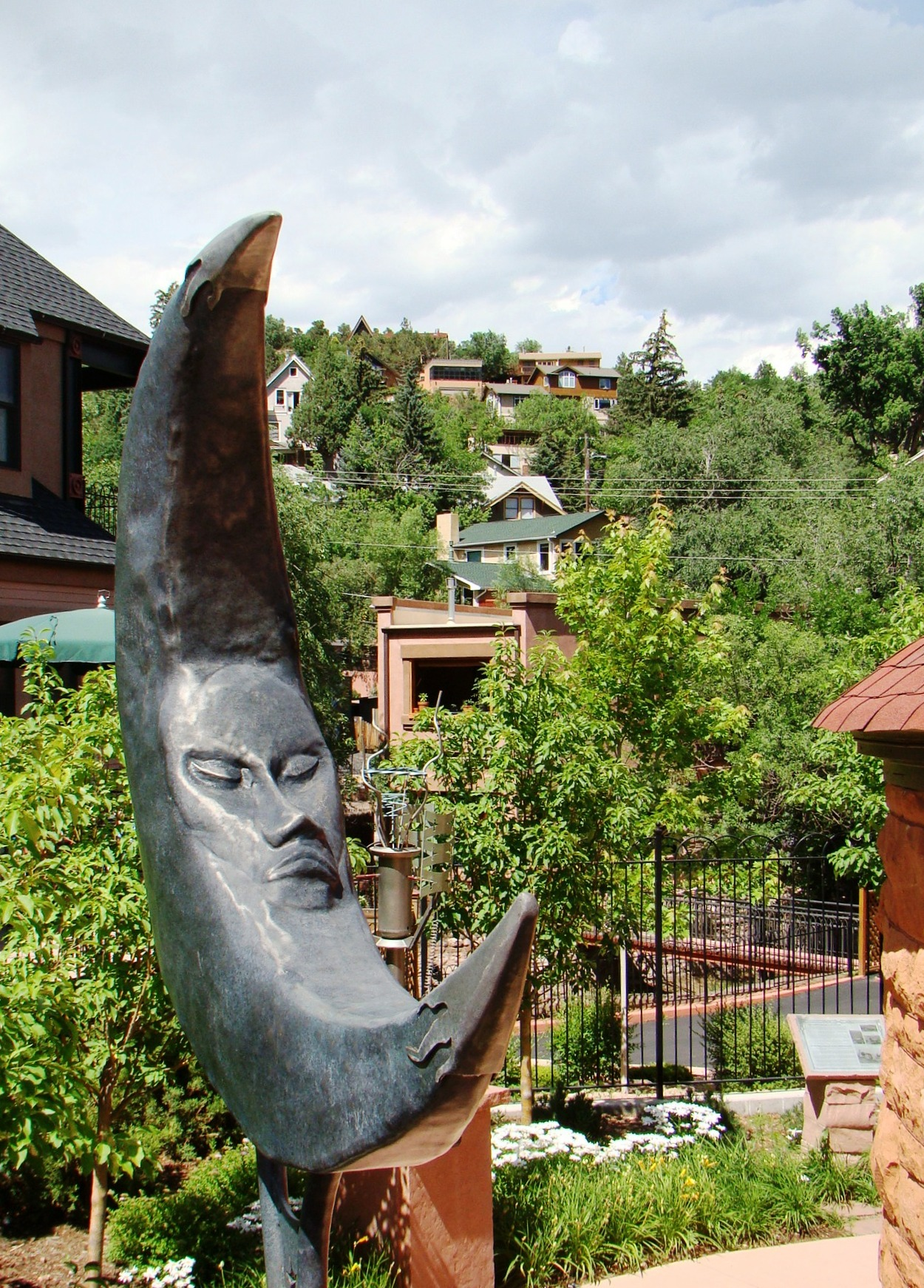

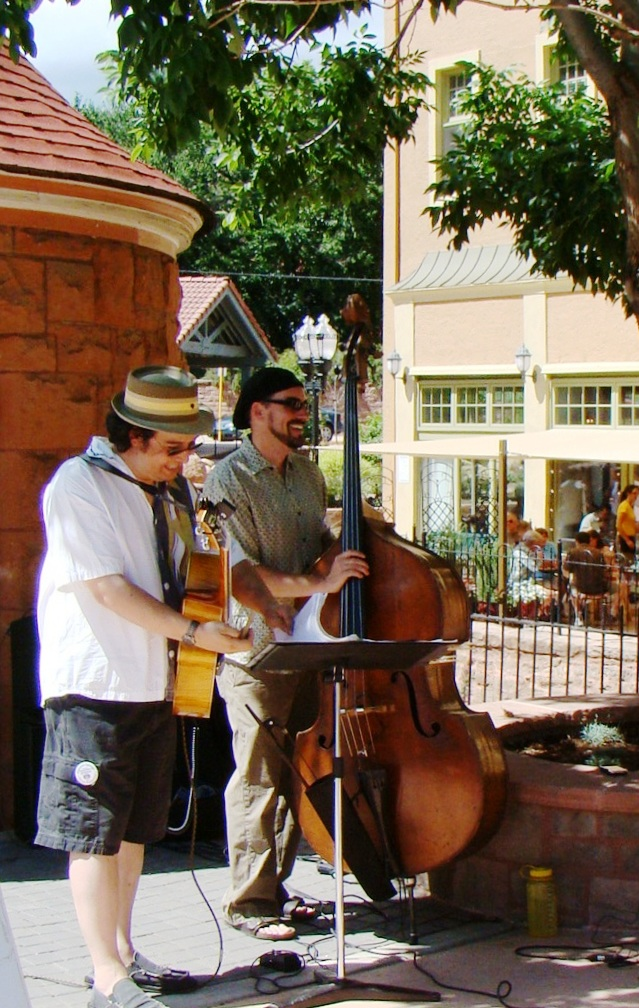

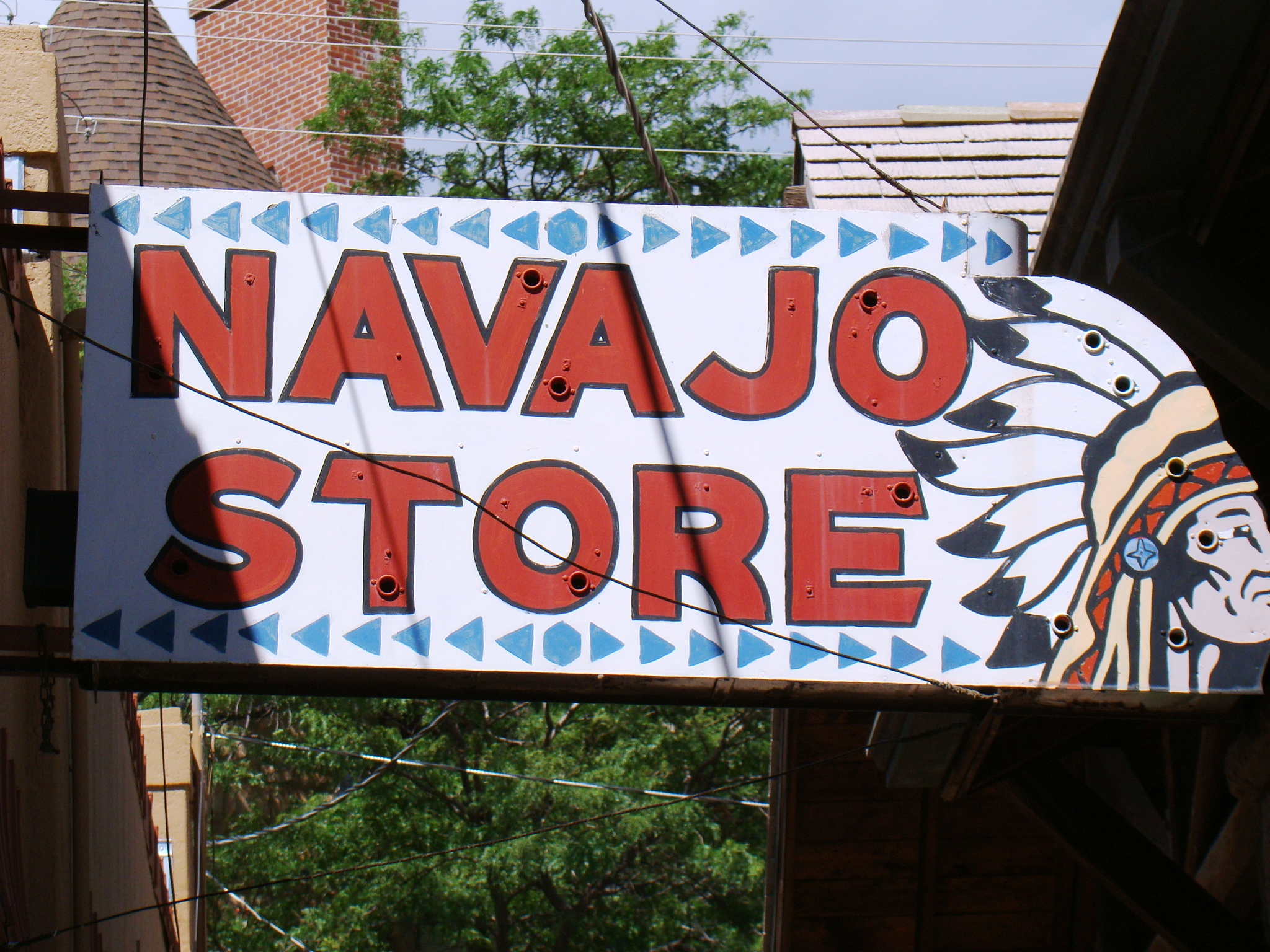
