= National Register of Historic Places listings in El Paso County, Colorado =

Location of El Paso County in Colorado

El Paso County, Colorado, United States, has 96 properties and districts listed on the National Register of Historic Places, including two National Historic Landmarks. Another property was once listed but has been removed.

The locations of National Register properties and districts for which the latitude and longitude coordinates are included below may be seen in a map.

This National Park Service list is complete through NPS recent listings posted October 2, 2026.

== Current listings ==
	Name on the Register	Image	Date listed	Location	City or town	Description
1	Alamo Hotel	Alamo Hotel	September 14, 1977 (#77000373)	128 S. Tejon St. 38°49′53″N 104°49′24″W	Colorado Springs	
2	Atchison, Topeka and Santa Fe Passenger Depot	Atchison, Topeka and Santa Fe Passenger Depot	September 10, 1979 (#79000597)	555 E. Pikes Peak Ave. 38°49′58″N 104°48′49″W	Colorado Springs	Designed by architect E. A. Harrison.
3	Barker House	Barker House	October 11, 1979 (#79000604)	819 Manitou; 38°51′28″N 104°55′00″W	Manitou Springs	
4	Bemis Hall	Bemis Hall	March 28, 1997 (#97000273)	920 N. Cascade Ave. 38°50′54″N 104°49′34″W	Colorado Springs	
5	Judson Moss Bemis House	Judson Moss Bemis House	September 14, 1979 (#79000598)	506 N. Cascade Ave. 38°50′28″N 104°49′28″W	Colorado Springs	
6	Black Forest School	Black Forest School	November 3, 1992 (#92001407)	6770 Shoup Rd. 39°00′47″N 104°42′02″W	Colorado Springs	
7	Black Squirrel Creek Bridge	Black Squirrel Creek Bridge	October 15, 2002 (#02001158)	U.S. Highway 24 at milepost 327.33; 39°00′12″N 104°30′46″W	Falcon	Demolished and replaced in 2012.
8	Boulder Crescent Place Historic District	Boulder Crescent Place Historic District	September 10, 1987 (#87001555)	9 and 11 W. Boulder St. and 312, 318, and 320 N. Cascade; 38°50′22″N 104°49′30″W	Colorado Springs	
9	Briarhurst	Briarhurst	April 23, 1973 (#73000473)	404 Manitou Ave. 38°51′14″N 104°54′12″W	Manitou Springs	
10	Bridge over Fountain Creek	Bridge over Fountain Creek	February 4, 1985 (#85000206)	U.S. Highway 24; 38°52′12″N 104°55′30″W	Manitou Springs	
11	Burgess House	Burgess House	September 13, 1990 (#90001418)	730 N. Nevada Ave. 38°50′41″N 104°49′16″W	Colorado Springs	
12	Calhan Paint Mines Archeological District	Calhan Paint Mines Archeological District	July 14, 2000 (#00000783)	Approximately 0.5 miles (0.80 km) southeast of the junction of S. Calhan Rd. and Paint Mine Rd. 39°01′07″N 104°16′04″W	Calhan	
13	Calhan Rock Island Railroad Depot	Calhan Rock Island Railroad Depot	April 20, 1995 (#95000476)	252 feet west of Denver St. on Rock Island Railroad right-of-way 39°02′18″N 104°17′57″W	Calhan	
14	Carlton House		November 3, 1989 (#89001785)	Pine Valley; 38°57′58″N 104°51′02″W	United States Air Force Academy	
15	Chadbourn Spanish Gospel Mission	Chadbourn Spanish Gospel Mission	January 14, 2009 (#08001316)	402 S. Conejos St. 38°49′42″N 104°49′54″W	Colorado Springs	
16	Chambers Ranch	Chambers Ranch	November 29, 1979 (#79000599)	3202 Chambers Way; 38°52′21″N 104°52′20″W	Colorado Springs	
17	City Hall of Colorado City	City Hall of Colorado City	June 3, 1982 (#82002300)	2902 W. Colorado Ave. 38°51′04″N 104°52′07″W	Colorado Springs	
18	Claremont	Claremont	April 13, 1977 (#77000374)	21 Broadmoor Ave. 38°47′26″N 104°50′24″W	Colorado Springs	
19	Cliff House	Cliff House	March 27, 1980 (#80000897)	306 Canon Ave. 38°51′35″N 104°55′00″W	Manitou Springs	
20	Colorado Springs Airport	Colorado Springs Airport	November 15, 1996 (#90001296)	Junction of Ent Ave. and Peterson Boulevard at Peterson Air Force Base; 38°49′22″N 104°42′07″W	Colorado Springs	
21	Colorado Springs and Cripple Creek District Railway-Corley Mountain Highway	Colorado Springs and Cripple Creek District Railway-Corley Mountain Highway	March 25, 1999 (#99000400)	Gold Camp Rd. and Forest Rd. 370; 38°44′56″N 104°56′58″W	Colorado Springs	
22	Colorado Springs City Auditorium	Colorado Springs City Auditorium	November 7, 1995 (#95001244)	231 E. Kiowa St. 38°50′06″N 104°49′11″W	Colorado Springs	
23	Colorado Springs City Hall	Colorado Springs City Hall	February 19, 2002 (#02000075)	107 N. Nevada Ave. 38°50′08″N 104°49′16″W	Colorado Springs	
24	Colorado Springs Day Nursery	Colorado Springs Day Nursery	February 23, 1990 (#90000304)	104 E. Rio Grande St. 38°49′28″N 104°49′25″W	Colorado Springs	
25	Colorado Springs Fine Arts Center	Colorado Springs Fine Arts Center	July 3, 1986 (#86001455)	30 W. Dale St. 38°50′45″N 104°49′32″W	Colorado Springs	
26	Colorado Springs Public Library-Carnegie Building	Colorado Springs Public Library-Carnegie Building	November 1, 1996 (#96001238)	21 W. Kiowa St. 38°50′08″N 104°49′35″W	Colorado Springs	
27	Frederick H. Cossitt Memorial Hall	Frederick H. Cossitt Memorial Hall	March 28, 1997 (#97000272)	906 N. Cascade Ave. 38°50′51″N 104°49′34″W	Colorado Springs	
28	Cottonwood Creek Bridge	Cottonwood Creek Bridge	October 12, 2001 (#01001104)	On Vincent Dr. over Cottonwood Creek; 38°55′43″N 104°48′35″W	Colorado Springs	
29	Crystal Valley Cemetery	Crystal Valley Cemetery	November 18, 1982 (#82001015)	Plainview Ave. 38°51′06″N 104°54′11″W	Manitou Springs	
30	Cutler Hall	Cutler Hall	July 3, 1986 (#86001410)	912 N. Cascade Ave. 38°50′53″N 104°49′30″W	Colorado Springs	
31	DeGraff Building	DeGraff Building	August 18, 1983 (#83001293)	116-118 N. Tejon; 38°50′10″N 104°49′25″W	Colorado Springs	
32	Dodge-Hamlin House	Dodge-Hamlin House	December 3, 2014 (#14000968)	1148 N. Cascade Ave., 1122 Wood Ave. 38°51′00″N 104°49′36″W	Colorado Springs	On the Colorado College campus.
33	Drennan School	Drennan School	April 16, 2008 (#08000290)	20500 Drennan Rd. 38°45′07″N 104°26′49″W	Colorado Springs	
34	Howard & Ruth Dutzi House	Howard & Ruth Dutzi House	April 2, 2025 (#100011600)	4300 Ridgecrest Drive; 38°53′40″N 104°46′53″W	Colorado Springs	
35	Eastholme	Eastholme	October 22, 1998 (#98001250)	4445 Haggerman Ave. 38°53′51″N 104°58′08″W	Cascade	
36	Edgeplain	Edgeplain	November 21, 2006 (#06001048)	1106 N. Nevada Ave. 38°50′59″N 104°49′15″W	Colorado Springs	
37	El Paso County Courthouse	El Paso County Courthouse	September 29, 1972 (#72000272)	215 S. Tejon St. 38°49′48″N 104°49′20″W	Colorado Springs	
38	El Pomar Estate	El Pomar Estate	November 22, 1995 (#95001328)	1661 Mesa Ave. 38°47′18″N 104°51′28″W	Colorado Springs	
39	Emmanuel Presbyterian Church	Emmanuel Presbyterian Church	May 17, 1984 (#84000830)	419 Mesa Rd. 38°50′45″N 104°49′54″W	Colorado Springs	
40	J.G. Evans Barn	J.G. Evans Barn	June 22, 2004 (#04000624)	Hodgen Rd. 39°04′18″N 104°41′25″W	Black Forest	
41	Evergreen Cemetery	Evergreen Cemetery	February 11, 1993 (#93000035)	1005 S. Hancock Ave. 38°48′56″N 104°47′43″W	Colorado Springs	
42	First Congregational Church	First Congregational Church	October 31, 2002 (#02001258)	20 E. St. Vrain St. 38°50′28″N 104°49′22″W	Colorado Springs	
43	First Congregational Church	First Congregational Church	October 16, 1979 (#79000606)	101 Pawnee Ave. 38°51′23″N 104°54′47″W	Manitou Springs	
44	First Presbyterian Church of Ramah	First Presbyterian Church of Ramah	July 7, 1988 (#88001015)	113 S. Commercial St. 39°07′13″N 104°10′02″W	Ramah	
45	Fort Collins Municipal Railway No. 22	Fort Collins Municipal Railway No. 22	December 15, 2011 (#11000901)	2333 Steel Dr. 38°52′01″N 104°49′53″W	Colorado Springs	
46	Giddings Building	Giddings Building	April 21, 1983 (#83001294)	101 N. Tejon St. 38°50′08″N 104°50′03″W	Colorado Springs	
47	Glen Eyrie	Glen Eyrie	April 21, 1975 (#75000519)	3820 N. 30th St. 38°53′29″N 104°53′05″W	Colorado Springs	Boundary increase listed December 20, 2016.
48	Grace and St. Stephen's Episcopal Church	Grace and St. Stephen's Episcopal Church	December 15, 2011 (#11000902)	631 N. Tejon St. 38°50′34″N 104°49′23″W	Colorado Springs	
49	Gwynne-Love House	Gwynne-Love House	February 5, 1987 (#87000010)	730 N. Cascade Ave. 38°50′42″N 104°49′29″W	Colorado Springs	
50	Hagerman Mansion	Hagerman Mansion	September 20, 1984 (#84000831)	610 N. Cascade Ave. 38°50′36″N 104°49′32″W	Colorado Springs	
51	Peggy Hill Cabin	Peggy Hill Cabin	July 28, 2025 (#100011505)	5250 Eisenhower Drive; 39°06′28″N 104°55′31″W	Palmer Lake vicinity	
52	Keithley Log Cabin Development District	Keithley Log Cabin Development District	November 18, 1982 (#82001016)	Roughly bounded by Santa Fe Pl., Crystal Rd., and Spur Rd. 38°51′13″N 104°53′59″W	Manitou Springs	
53	Lennox House	Lennox House	October 21, 1999 (#99001266)	1001 N. Nevada Ave. 38°50′53″N 104°49′10″W	Colorado Springs	
54	Inez Johnson Lewis School	Inez Johnson Lewis School	November 3, 1988 (#88002306)	146 Jefferson St. 39°05′28″N 104°52′13″W	Monument	
55	Lindley-Johnson-Vanderhoof House	Lindley-Johnson-Vanderhoof House	December 3, 2013 (#13000870)	1130 N. Cascade Ave. 38°51′01″N 104°49′30″W	Colorado Springs	
56	Little Fountain Creek Bridge		October 15, 2002 (#02001153)	State Highway 115 at milepost 36.84; 38°40′36″N 104°50′55″W	Widefield	Replaced in 2004.
57	Manitou Bathhouse	Manitou Bathhouse	August 1, 1979 (#79000608)	934 Manitou Ave. 38°51′33″N 104°55′02″W	Manitou Springs	
58	Manitou Springs Bridges (2)	Manitou Springs Bridges (2)	June 24, 1985 (#85001398)	Park Ave. and Cannon Ave. over Fountain Creek; 38°51′30″N 104°54′57″W	Manitou Springs	
59	Manitou Springs Historic District	Manitou Springs Historic District	October 7, 1983 (#83003516)	Roughly bounded by El Paso Boulevard, Ruxton Ave., U.S. Highway 24, and Iron Mt. Ave. 38°51′28″N 104°55′14″W	Manitou Springs	
60	Maytag Aircraft Building	Maytag Aircraft Building	January 16, 2008 (#07001393)	701 S. Cascade Ave. 38°49′27″N 104°49′30″W	Colorado Springs	
61	McAllister House	McAllister House	August 14, 1973 (#73000472)	423 N. Cascade Ave. 38°50′21″N 104°49′26″W	Colorado Springs	
62	McGregor Hall	McGregor Hall	January 27, 2000 (#99001705)	930 N. Cascade Ave. 38°50′56″N 104°49′36″W	Colorado Springs	
63	Midland Terminal Railroad Roundhouse	Midland Terminal Railroad Roundhouse	July 10, 1979 (#79000600)	600 S. 21st St. 38°50′24″N 104°51′32″W	Colorado Springs	
64	Miramont	Miramont	April 11, 1977 (#77000375)	9 Capitol Hill; 38°51′33″N 104°55′19″W	Manitou Springs	
65	Montgomery Hall, Colorado College	Montgomery Hall, Colorado College	September 13, 1990 (#90001419)	1030 N. Cascade Ave. 38°50′56″N 104°49′33″W	Colorado Springs	
66	Monument Valley Park	Monument Valley Park	January 25, 2007 (#06001287)	Approximately bounded by Monroe, Culebra, Westview, and Bijou Sts., the BNSF railway line, and the western edge of the main north/south trail, all north of Del Norte; 38°51′11″N 104°49′48″W	Colorado Springs	
67	Dr. Isaac E. and Katherine C. Moore House		July 28, 2025 (#100011568)	738 North Spruce Street; 38°50′38″N 104°49′57″W	Colorado Springs	
68	Navajo Hogan	Navajo Hogan	September 13, 1990 (#90001420)	2817 N. Nevada Ave. 38°52′20″N 104°49′08″W	Colorado Springs	
69	North Cheyenne Canon Park	North Cheyenne Canon Park	July 8, 2009 (#09000489)	2120 N. Cheyenne Cañon Rd. 38°47′26″N 104°52′26″W	Colorado Springs	
70	North Weber Street-Wahsatch Avenue Historic Residential District	North Weber Street-Wahsatch Avenue Historic Residential District	February 8, 1985 (#85000205)	N. Weber St. between Boulder and Del Norte St., and N. Wahsatch Ave. between St. Vrain and Columbia St. 38°50′53″N 104°49′04″W	Colorado Springs	
71	Old Colorado City Historic Commercial District	Old Colorado City Historic Commercial District	November 2, 1982 (#82001018)	Northern side of Colorado Ave. from 24th St., west to 2611 Colorado Ave., also includes 115 S. 26 St. and 2418 W. Pikes Peak Ave. 38°50′50″N 104°51′46″W	Colorado Springs	
72	Old Livery Stable	Old Livery Stable	March 2, 1979 (#79000603)	217 W. Missouri; 38°40′57″N 104°42′08″W	Fountain	
73	Old North End Historic District	Old North End Historic District	December 17, 1982 (#82001017)	Roughly bounded by Monument Valley Wood, Nevada Ave., and Madison and Unitah Sts.; also bounded by Monument Valley Park, the alley between Nevada Ave. and Weber St., and Lilac and Uintah Sts. 38°51′27″N 104°49′21″W	Colorado Springs	Second set of addresses represent a boundary increase of September 14, 2015, which changed the name from "North End Historic District".
74	Palmer Hall	Palmer Hall	July 3, 1986 (#86001412)	116 E. San Rafael; 38°50′56″N 104°49′19″W	Colorado Springs	
75	Pauline Chapel	Pauline Chapel	February 26, 2001 (#00001370)	2 Park Ave. 38°47′31″N 104°51′14″W	Colorado Springs	
76	People's Methodist Episcopal Church	People's Methodist Episcopal Church	July 25, 2014 (#14000432)	527 E. St. Vrain St. 38°50′26″N 104°48′55″W	Colorado Springs	
77	Pikes Peak	Pikes Peak	October 15, 1966 (#66000245)	10 miles (16 km) west of Colorado Springs in the Pike National Forest; 38°50′27″N 105°02′37″W	Colorado Springs	
78	Pioneer Cabin	Pioneer Cabin	January 27, 1975 (#75000520)	11 miles (18 km) north of Colorado Springs off Interstate 25; 38°59′25″N 104°51′22″W	United States Air Force Academy	
79	Plaza Hotel	Plaza Hotel	September 1, 1983 (#83001317)	830 N. Tejon St. 38°50′46″N 104°49′21″W	Colorado Springs	
80	Ponderosa Lodge	Ponderosa Lodge	August 29, 2008 (#08000829)	6145 Shoup Rd. 39°00′33″N 104°43′00″W	Colorado Springs	
81	Ida M. Rice House	Ida M. Rice House	November 21, 2006 (#06001049)	1196 N. Cascade Ave. 38°51′02″N 104°49′28″W	Colorado Springs	
82	The Satellite		October 6, 2026 (#100012898)	411 Lakewood Circle; 38°49′19″N 104°45′35″W	Colorado Springs	
83	Second Midland School	Second Midland School	September 12, 1980 (#80000895)	815 S. 25th St. 38°50′28″N 104°51′59″W	Colorado Springs	
84	Shove Memorial Chapel	Shove Memorial Chapel	May 22, 2005 (#05000426)	1010 N. Tejon St. 38°50′52″N 104°49′16″W	Colorado Springs	
85	Shrine of the Sun	Shrine of the Sun	November 3, 1994 (#94001229)	4250 Cheyenne Mountain Zoo Rd. 38°46′20″N 104°51′44″W	Colorado Springs	
86	St. Mary's Catholic Church	St. Mary's Catholic Church	June 3, 1982 (#82002301)	26 W. Kiowa St. 38°50′11″N 104°49′35″W	Colorado Springs	
87	Stockbridge House	Stockbridge House	September 11, 1980 (#80000896)	2801 W. Colorado Ave. 38°51′00″N 104°52′01″W	Colorado Springs	
88	Taylor Memorial Chapel	Taylor Memorial Chapel	April 15, 1999 (#99000447)	6145 Shoup Rd. 39°00′24″N 104°43′07″W	Colorado Springs	
89	Ticknor Hall	Ticknor Hall	January 27, 2000 (#99001704)	926 Cascade Ave. 38°50′55″N 104°49′30″W	Colorado Springs	
90	United States Air Force Academy, Cadet Area	United States Air Force Academy, Cadet Area	April 1, 2004 (#04000484)	Roughly between Cadet Drive and Faculty Drive; 39°00′40″N 104°53′08″W	United States Air Force Academy	
91	US Post Office and Federal Courthouse-Colorado Springs Main	US Post Office and Federal Courthouse-Colorado Springs Main	January 22, 1986 (#86000170)	210 Pikes Peak Ave. 38°50′00″N 104°49′15″W	Colorado Springs	
92	US Post Office-Manitou Springs Main	US Post Office-Manitou Springs Main	January 24, 1986 (#86000181)	307 Canon Ave. 38°51′36″N 104°55′03″W	Manitou Springs	
93	Van Briggle Pottery Company	Van Briggle Pottery Company	April 29, 2009 (#09000249)	1125 Glen Ave./231 W. Uintah St. 38°51′02″N 104°49′46″W	Colorado Springs	
94	Wheeler Bank	Wheeler Bank	September 12, 1980 (#80000898)	717-719 Manitou Ave. 38°51′25″N 104°54′54″W	Manitou Springs	
95	S.A. Wilson Elementary School	S.A. Wilson Elementary School	May 1, 2017 (#100000929)	930 Leta Dr. 38°45′59″N 104°44′23″W	Colorado Springs	
96	John Wolfe House	John Wolfe House	January 23, 2013 (#12001193)	905 W. Cheyenne Rd. 38°48′00″N 104°50′35″W	Colorado Springs	
97	Y.W.C.A.	Y.W.C.A.	September 10, 1979 (#79000602)	130 E. Kiowa St. 38°50′08″N 104°49′17″W	Colorado Springs	

== Former listing ==
	Name on the Register	Image	Date listed	Date removed	Location	City or town	Description
1	Chief Theatre		1973 (#73002258)	Unknown	21 1/2 E. Pikes Peak	Colorado Springs	Also known as the Burns Theatre. Demolished in 1973.
2	Cragmor Sanatorium		May 29, 1989 (#98000586)	September 16, 2002	1420 Austin Bluffs Parkway	Colorado Springs	Significantly reconstructed in 2001.

== See also ==
- List of National Historic Landmarks in Colorado
- List of National Register of Historic Places in Colorado
- Bibliography of Colorado
- Geography of Colorado
- History of Colorado
- Index of Colorado-related articles
- List of Colorado-related lists
- Outline of Colorado
