= Pioneers Cabin =

Pioneers Cabin may refer to:

- Pioneers Cabin (Colorado)
- Pioneers Cabin (Edmonton)
