= Pauline Chapel =

Pauline Chapel may refer to:

- Cappella Paolina in the Vatican
- The Cappella Paolina in the church of Santa Maria Maggiore
- The Cappella Paolina in the Quirinal Palace
- Pauline Chapel (Colorado Springs, Colorado), a chapel on the National Register of Historic Places
