= Wolfe House =

Wolfe House may refer to:

in the United States

(by state, then city/town)

- John Wolfe House, Colorado Springs, Colorado, listed on the National Register of Historic Places (NRHP) in El Paso County
- Johnson-Wolfe Farm, Comus, Maryland, listed on the NRHP in Montgomery County
- James K.P. Wolfe House, Frederick, Maryland, listed on the NRHP in Frederick County
- Wolfe House (Terry, Mississippi), listed on the NRHP in Hinds County
- Thomas Wolfe House, Asheville, North Carolina, listed on the NRHP in Buncombe County
- Mary A. Wolfe House, Cincinnati, Ohio, listed on the NRHP in Hamilton County

== See also ==
- Wolf House (disambiguation)
- Wolfe Ranch Historical District Moab, Utah, NRHP-listed
