= Ticknor Hall =

- U.S. National Register of Historic Places
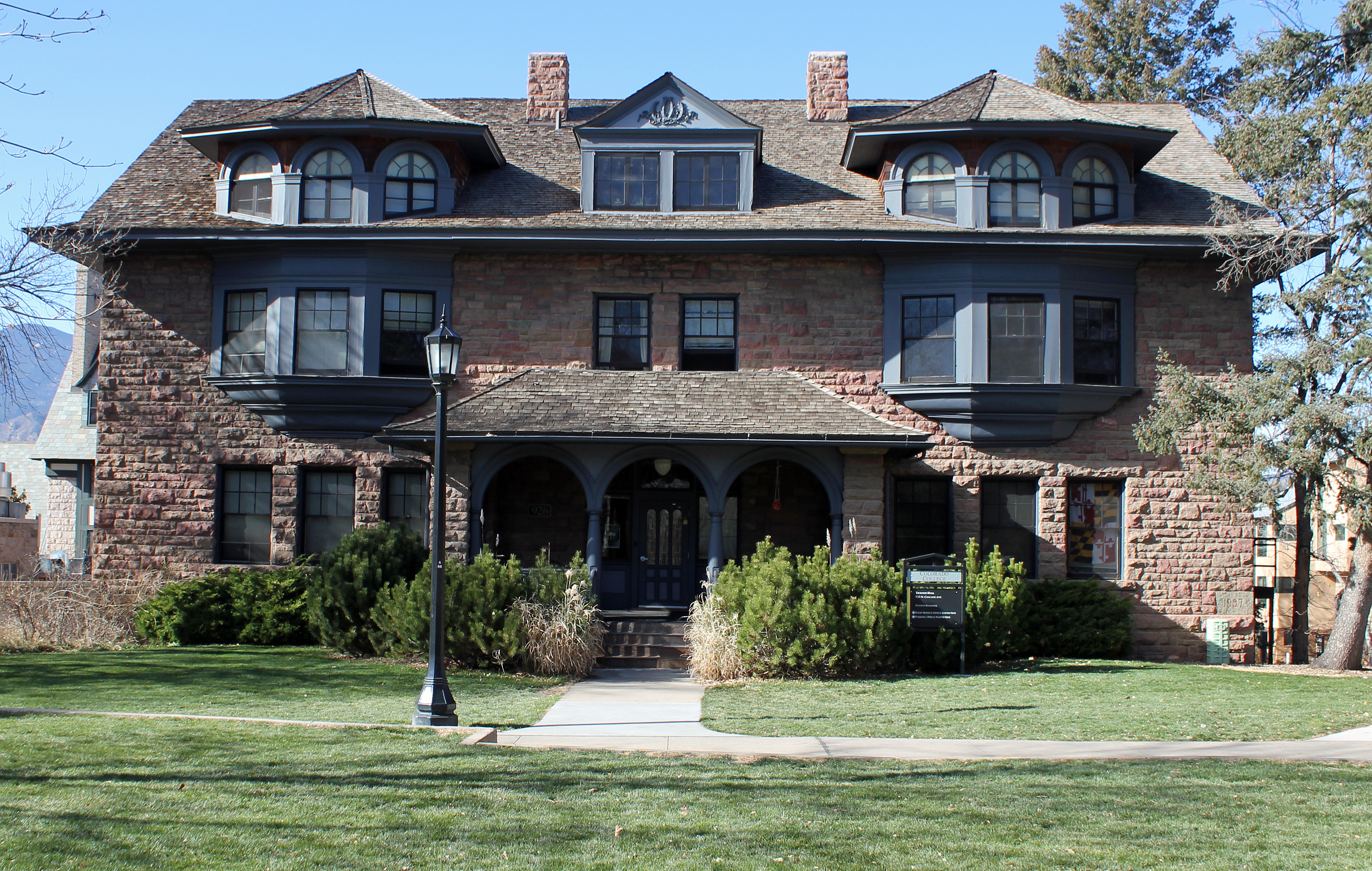

- Location within Colorado Location within the United States
- Location: 926 Cascade Ave., Colorado Springs, CO
- Coordinates: 38°50′55″N 104°49′30″W
- Built: 1897-98
- Architect: Walter F. Douglas
- Architectural style: Queen Anne
- NRHP reference No.: 99001704
- Added to NRHP: January 27, 2000

The Ticknor Hall is a dormitory for the Colorado College designed by Walter F. Douglas and finished in 1898. The dormitory was the second dormitory in the Colorado College built specifically for women. The building is located in downtown Colorado Springs, Colorado and is noted for its use of the Queen Anne architectural style.

The building was listed on the National Register of Historic Places in 2000.

== See also ==
- National Register of Historic Places listings in El Paso County, Colorado
