= McGregor Hall =

- U.S. National Register of Historic Places
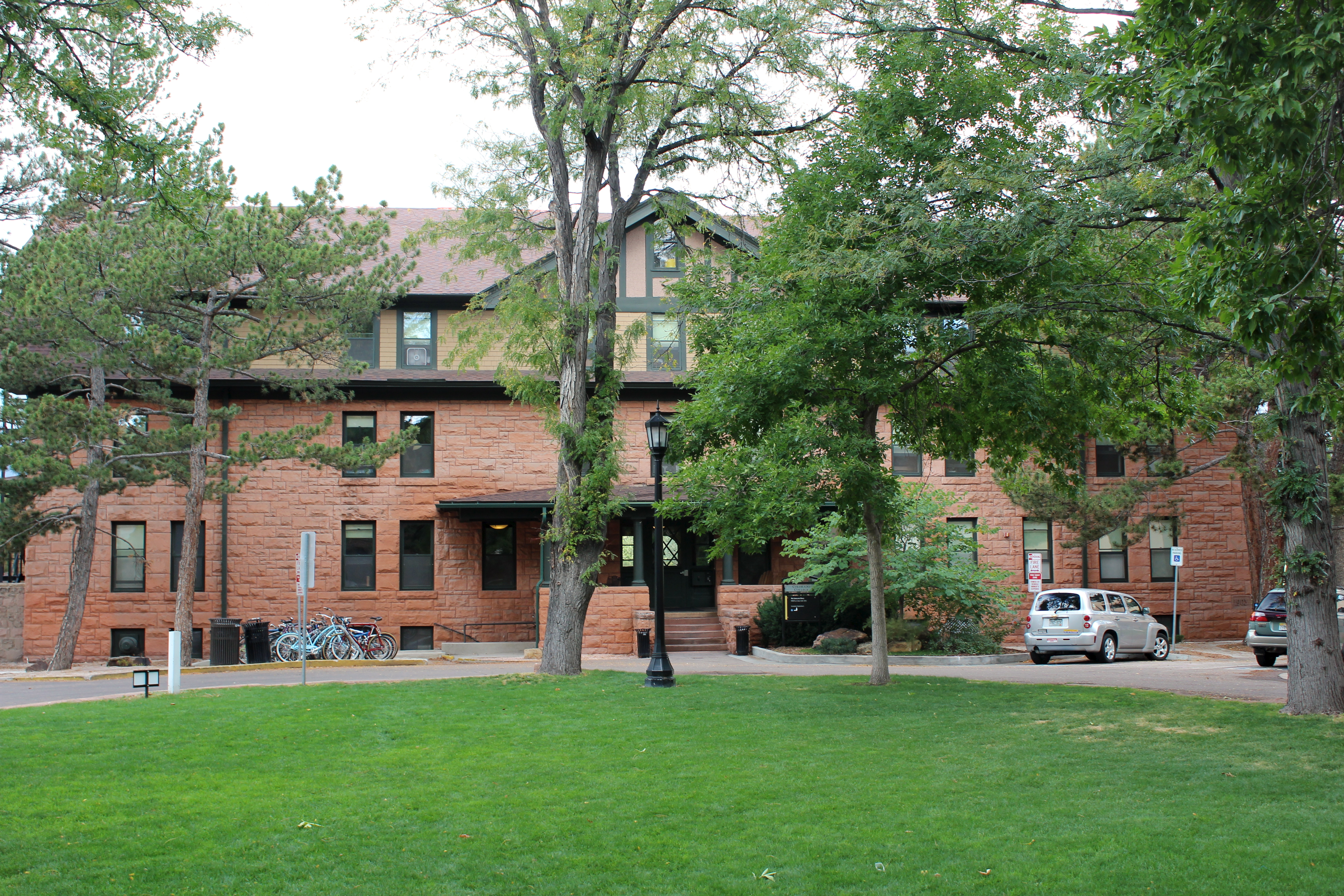

- Location within Colorado Location within the United States
- Location: 930 N. Cascade Ave., Colorado Springs, CO
- Coordinates: 38°50′56″N 104°49′36″W
- Area: less than one acre
- Built: 1903
- Architect: Walter F. Douglas and Thomas Duncan Hetherington
- Architectural style: Colonial Revival
- NRHP reference No.: 99001705
- Added to NRHP: January 27, 2000

The McGregor Hall is a historic building designed by Walter F. Douglas and Thomas Duncan Hetherington and built in 1903. The building is located on the grounds of the Colorado College in Colorado Springs, Colorado. The building was the third dormitory for women on the Colorado College campus.

The building is notable for its Colorado Springs red sandstone, and is built in the Colonial Revival style. The property was listed on the National Register of Historic Places in 2000.

== See also ==
- National Register of Historic Places listings in El Paso County, Colorado
