= Burgess House (Colorado Springs, Colorado) =

Historic house in Colorado, United States

- U.S. National Register of Historic Places
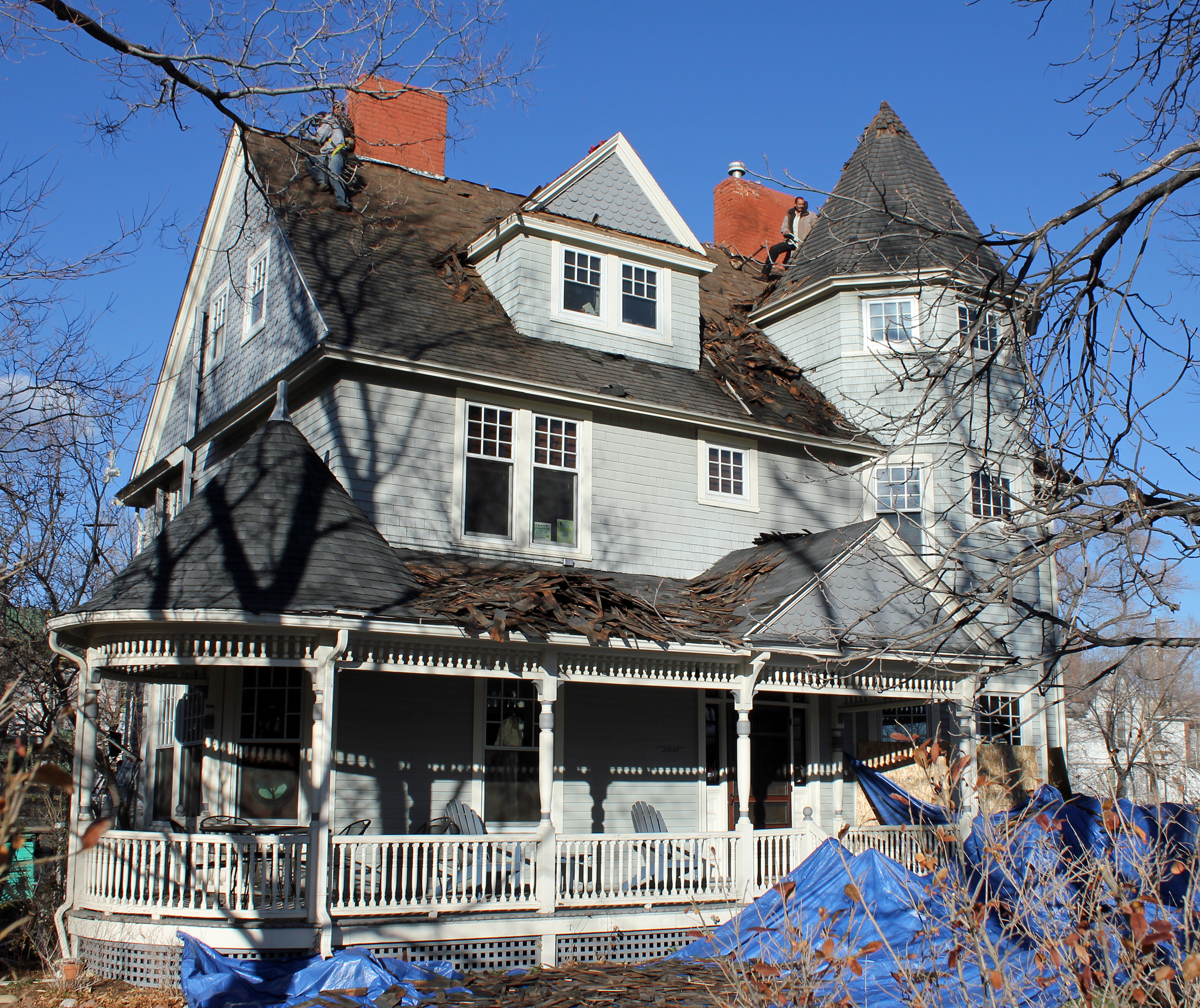

- Location within Colorado Location within the United States
- Location: 730 North Nevada AVE., Colorado Springs, Colorado
- Coordinates: 38°50′41.75″N 104°49′17.07″W
- Built: 1888
- Architectural style: Queen Anne
- NRHP reference No.: 90001418
- Added to NRHP: 9/13/1990

The Burgess House is a building in Colorado Springs, Colorado which was built in 1888 by Charles H. Burgess, and is one of the few remaining buildings from the first wave of Colorado Springs development. The house is a Pattern house and was listed on the National Register of Historic Places in 1990. The building is of Queen Anne style.

== Building ==
The house was constructed in 1888 in Colorado Springs, Colorado .

== See also ==
- National Register of Historic Places listings in El Paso County, Colorado
