= The Colorado Springs School =

The Colorado Springs School (Claremont)

Location
- 21 Broadmoor Avenue; Colorado Springs, Colorado 80906; United States

Information
- Type: Preparatory school
- Established: 1961 (65 years ago)
- Head of school: To be determined
- Faculty: 63
- Enrollment: 140
- Campus: 32 acres (130,000 m^{2})
- Colors: Blue and white
- Mascot: Kodiaks
- Website: www.css.org
- The Colorado Springs School
- U.S. National Register of Historic Places
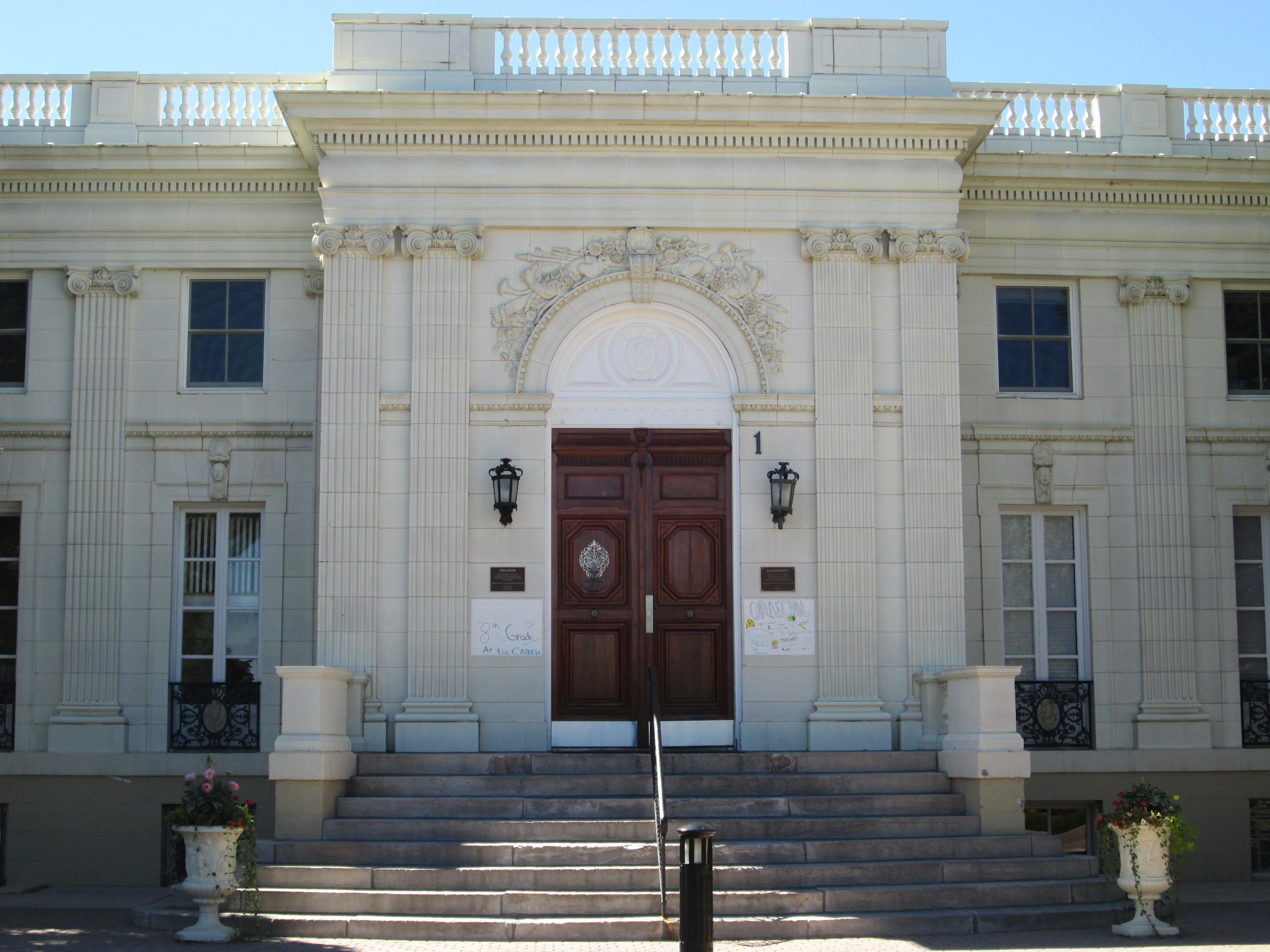
- Entrance to the school

- Location within Colorado Location within the United States
- Location: 21 Broadmoor Ave., Colorado Springs, Colorado
- Coordinates: 38°47′26″N 104°50′24″W
- Area: 5 acres (2.0 ha)
- Built: 1906
- Architect: Thomas MacLaren
- NRHP reference No.: 77000374
- Added to NRHP: April 13, 1977

The Colorado Springs School (CSS), on the estate formerly known as Claremont, is a private, nonprofit, college preparatory school serving pre-kindergarten to 12th grade in Colorado Springs.

The 28-acre (110,000 m^{2}) campus is located on the former Claremont Estate, built in 1907 as the home of Charles and Virginia Baldwin. The main building, known as the Trianon (formerly called "Claremont"), is listed on the National Register of Historic Places. The school is set in a residential neighborhood at the foot of the Rocky Mountains.

CSS is accredited by The Association of Colorado Independent Schools (ACIS) and is a member of the National Association of Independent Schools (NAIS).

== History ==
The Colorado Springs Episcopal School for Girls was a college preparatory school that was established through a certificate of incorporation in July 1961. In March 1962 it was renamed The Colorado Springs School for Girls when it dropped its affiliation with the Episcopal church. The school opened in September 1962 with 23 students in the former home of Walter Drake and his wife on Pourtales Road with Margaret Campbell as its first Headmistress. By the spring of 1967, enrollment had nearly quadrupled and the board of trustees voted to purchase both the Trianon property at 21 Broadmoor Avenue and nearly 12 acres known today as Boddington Field.

The school purchased a home at 24 Pourtales for boarding of students in the fall of 1965. In 1970 the school opened its program to boys and in 1975 was renamed The Colorado Springs School when it became "fully coeducational" for grades 7 through 12. In 1976 the Children's School was founded for education from Kindergarten through 12th grade, and merged with The Colorado Springs School. Experiential education was integrated into the school's educational program beginning in 1976. A pre-kindergarten program was established in 1994 and in 1998 a preschool was added to the school. The school's boarding program ended and a Homestay Program was established in 2000.

In 2012, the school celebrated its 50th anniversary. In 2015, the school graduated its 50th class. In 2026 the schools headmaster Ryan Kelly left mid year unexpectedly and has taken a new job elsewhere. As of 7 June there has been no public statement of who will be the head of school. Below is a message sent out to the school community, with the finalists:

May 14, 2026

Dear CSS Community,

On behalf of the Head of School Search Committee, we are pleased to share that, following a rigorous paper screening process and first-round virtual interviews, The Colorado Springs School will move forward with on-campus interviews for three Head of School finalists:

● Dr. Donald Ball (Download Resume)

● David Garner (Download Resume)

● Erik Playe (Download Resume)

The school has had ten heads of school: Margaret Campbell (1962–1974); Robert MacDonald (1974–1979); Jerel Cathey (1979–1983); Donald W. Fudge (1983–1986); George S. Swope (1986–1989); Mary Flemke (1989–2000); Mickey Landry (2000–2007); Kevin Reel (2007–2013); Aaron Schubach (2014 - 2020); and Tambi Tyler (2020 - 2023); Dr. Ryan Kelly (2024-current).

== Campus buildings ==
The Colorado Springs School has eight academic buildings covering Preschool through Grade 12. The high school building is called the El Pomar Academic Center, as it was donated by the El Pomar Foundation The middle school and administrative offices are housed in the historic Trianon.The Children's Academic Center holds classrooms for Grade 2 through Grade 5. The Early Childhood Center has Preschool, Kindergarten, and 1st grade classrooms. A theater and gallery are located in the Louisa Performing Arts Center. The Louise Honnen Tutt Field House is the school's gymnasium, locker rooms, weight room, and music classrooms. The Lewis B. Maytag Dining Hall is the cafeteria for all grade levels. The Carriage House holds art classrooms, a photography darkroom, and facilities offices.

== Experiential education ==
The school offers experiential education to its students, which allows students to learn in "real world" experiences outside of the classroom through activity, project, place, service and problem-based learning.

== See also ==
- National Register of Historic Places listings in El Paso County, Colorado
