= Colorado Springs City Auditorium =

Historic auditorium in Colorado Springs, Colorado, U.S.

- U.S. National Register of Historic Places
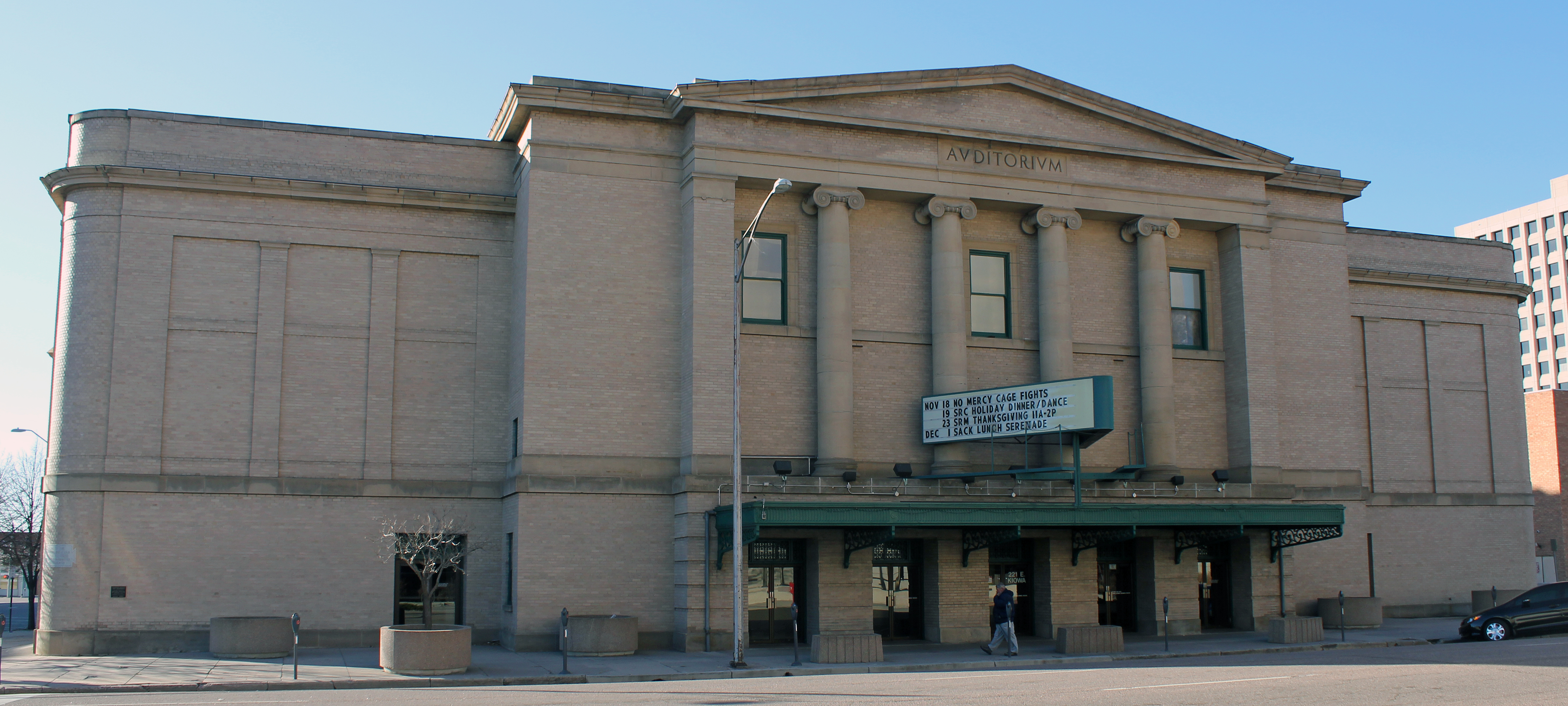
- The Colorado Springs City Auditorium in 2011

- Location within Colorado Location within the United States
- Location: 221 E. Kiowa St., Colorado Springs, Colorado, U.S.
- Coordinates: 38°50′6″N 104°49′11″W
- Area: 1.1 acres (0.45 ha)
- Built: 1923
- Architects: Charles E. Thomas, Thomas C. MacLaren, et al
- Architectural style: Classical Revival
- Website: www.coloradosprings.gov/parks-recreation-and-cultural-services/page/city-auditorium
- NRHP reference No.: 95001244
- Added to NRHP: November 07, 1995

Colorado Springs City Auditorium is a historic auditorium in Colorado Springs, Colorado, United States. Completed in 1923, the auditorium still serves the city of Colorado Springs by way of hosting various events throughout the year. The building, cost $424,910 at the time, was primarily used for concerts, theatre performances and graduations. The plaque above the stage is inscribed, "USUI CIVIUM DECORI URBUS", or "For the use of the people and the glory of the city." In the 1940s, a local promoter, Abe Marylander, brought wrestling exhibitions and boxing matches to the facility. As the years passed, the City Auditorium has played host to various musical concerts, the Harlem Globetrotters, many conventions and trade shows, professional wrestling, boxing, mixed martial arts, roller derby and more. The City Auditorium was added to the National Register of Historic Places on November 7, 1995.

The Pikemasters Model Railroad club is housed in the Auditorium's basement. Located in the old Colorado Springs Police firing range, as of 2019 they hosted meetings every Thursday night, at which visitors were welcome.

== See also ==
- National Register of Historic Places listings in El Paso County, Colorado
