= Old Livery Stable =

- U.S. National Register of Historic Places
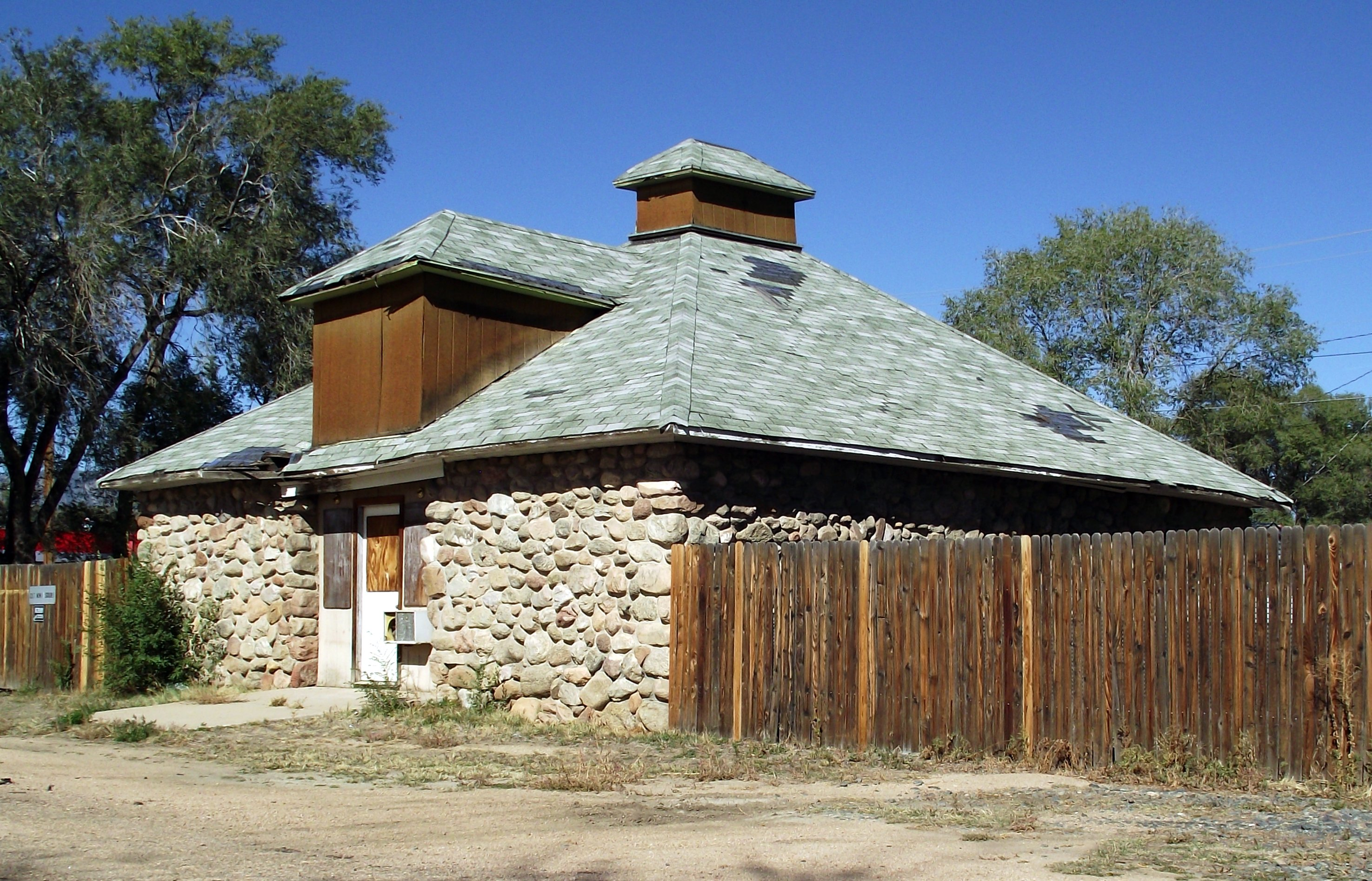

- Location within Colorado Location within the United States
- Location: 217 W. Missouri, Fountain, Colorado
- Coordinates: 38°40′57″N 104°42′8″W
- Area: 0.3 acres (0.12 ha)
- Built: 1893
- NRHP reference No.: 79000603
- Added to NRHP: March 2, 1979

The Old Livery Stable in Fountain, Colorado is a historic stable which was built in 1893 as part of a small hotel complex. It housed horses of hotel guests. With the rise of automobiles such use ended and the stable decayed. The hotel was damaged in a fire in the 1940s, then partially repaired to serve as a rooming house, then demolished to make way for new buildings; only the stable remains.

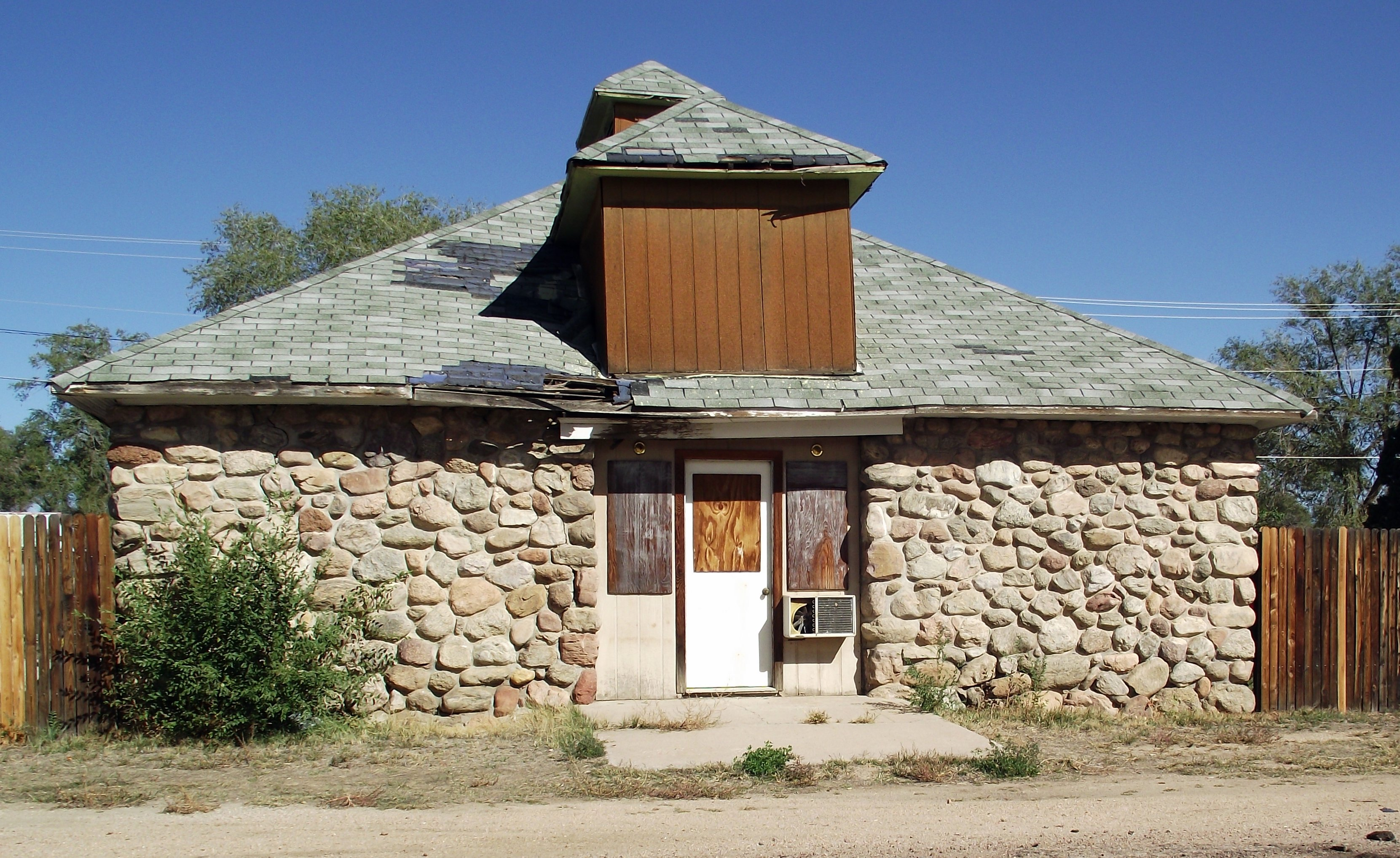
Another view

Its NRHP nomination states that the stable is:

a vestige of the life and commerce of an earlier day in Fountain. Although vernacular in style, the architecture is of particular interest. The thick, heavy walls; the use of crude stones; the massiveness of the construction; and the integrated use of the dormer and cupola in a stable all reflect a time and a place where there was relatively little architectural knowledge, a time and a place where the builders drew on their rough experiences to build a utilitarian structure to serve the hotel trade. Today the Old Livery Stable stands as a landmark in downtown Fountain.

== See also ==
- National Register of Historic Places listings in El Paso County, Colorado
