= Thomas MacLaren =

Scottish architect

Thomas MacLaren (19 February 1863 - 4 December 1928) was a Scottish architect. He was educated at the Kensington School of Art in Edinburgh and the Royal College of Art. After completing his education, MacLaren worked in London, and then moved to the United States for his health. He first lived in Denver, Colorado, and then Colorado Springs, Colorado, where he worked from 1894 until 1928.

Many of the buildings he worked on are listed with the National Register of Historic Places.

== Early years ==
Thomas MacLaren was born on 19 February 1863 in Scotland to John MacLaren, who was a farmer and father of 11 children.

== Education and early career ==
He studied at the Edinburgh's Kensington School of Art and, beginning in 1882, studied architecture at the Royal College of Art in London. At the school he won a silver medal and gold medal. He won two traveling scholarships, the Travelling Scholarship and Royal Institute of British Architects (RIBA) Pugin Travelling Studentship in 1885 and 1887 allowed him to travel to Italy (March to October 1886), France and Belgium. His health declined, in part due to the effort that was taken to create the entries for the competitions.

MacLaren moved to London, England in January 1880, lived with his brother, also an architect, James MacLaren and worked there after completing his studies.

In December 1886, he became a member of the Architectural Association. He traveled in April–May 1888 to northern Italy, and in August that year to Aberdeenshire and Kincardineshire in Scotland to study castles. He worked for architect William Flockhart and at times worked in his brother's practice.

MacLaren became an assistant to Frederick William Stevens in October 1888. The following year he established his own practice at 10 Great Queen Street, Westminster, London. His designs were exhibited at the Royal Academy in 1891 and in 1892 he passed the qualifying exam. He became an associate of the Royal Institute of British Architects.

James MacLaren, Thomas' brother, died of tuberculosis in October 1890 and Thomas MacLaren had also developed symptoms of the disease. He want to Engadin, Switzerland to recover. While there, he made watercolor paintings of Swiss architecture.

== Career in Colorado ==
He moved to Denver, Colorado in the winter of 1892 to improve his health. MacLaren came with architect Mervyn Macartney who also left the British Isles for his health. MacLaren then moved to Colorado Springs, Colorado where he worked from 1894 to 1928. Thomas D. Hetherington and Charles E. Thomas were his partners for part of that period. He also worked on his own. He was considered the "premier architect" in the city during his career.

== Works ==
MacLaren worked on churches, libraries, schools and homes, some of which have been listed on the National Register of Historic Places, including:

- St. Stephen's Episcopal Church, 1895
- Christ Episcopal Church, 1902
- Colorado Springs City Hall, 1904
- Claremont, 1906
- Boulder Carnegie Library, 1906
- Chambers Ranch, also called Rock Ledge Ranch, 1907
- Salida Public Library, 1907–1909
- Cragmore Sanatarium, 1914
- Several buildings on the El Pomar estate, 1916–1917
- Glen Eyrie Carriage House, 1922
- Colorado Springs City Auditorium, 1922

== Death ==
MacLaren died on 4 December 1928.
