= Wolf House =

Wolf House or similar terms may refer to:

- Jacob Wolf House, Norfork, Arkansas, NRHP-listed
- Wolf House (Berkeley Student Cooperative), Berkeley, California
- Wolf House (Glen Ellen, California), associated with author Jack London
- Wolf House (Denver, Colorado), a Denver Landmark
- George John Wolf House, Hammond, Indiana, NRHP-listed
- Josephus Wolf House, Valparaiso, Indiana, NRHP-listed
- Mier Wolf House, Mason City, Iowa, NRHP-listed
- Charles Wolf House, Parkersburg, Iowa, NRHP-listed
- William R. Wolf House, Waseca, Minnesota, NRHP-listed
- Wolf-Ruebeling House, Defiance, Missouri, NRHP-listed
- The Wolf House, 2018 Chilean film
- The House of Wolf, 2025 historical novel by British actor Tony Robinson

== See also ==
- Penrose Wolf Building, Rockwood, Pennsylvania, NRHP-listed
- Wolf Hotel, Ellinwood, Kansas, NRHP-listed
- Wolfe House (disambiguation)
