= J.G. Evans Barn =

- U.S. National Register of Historic Places
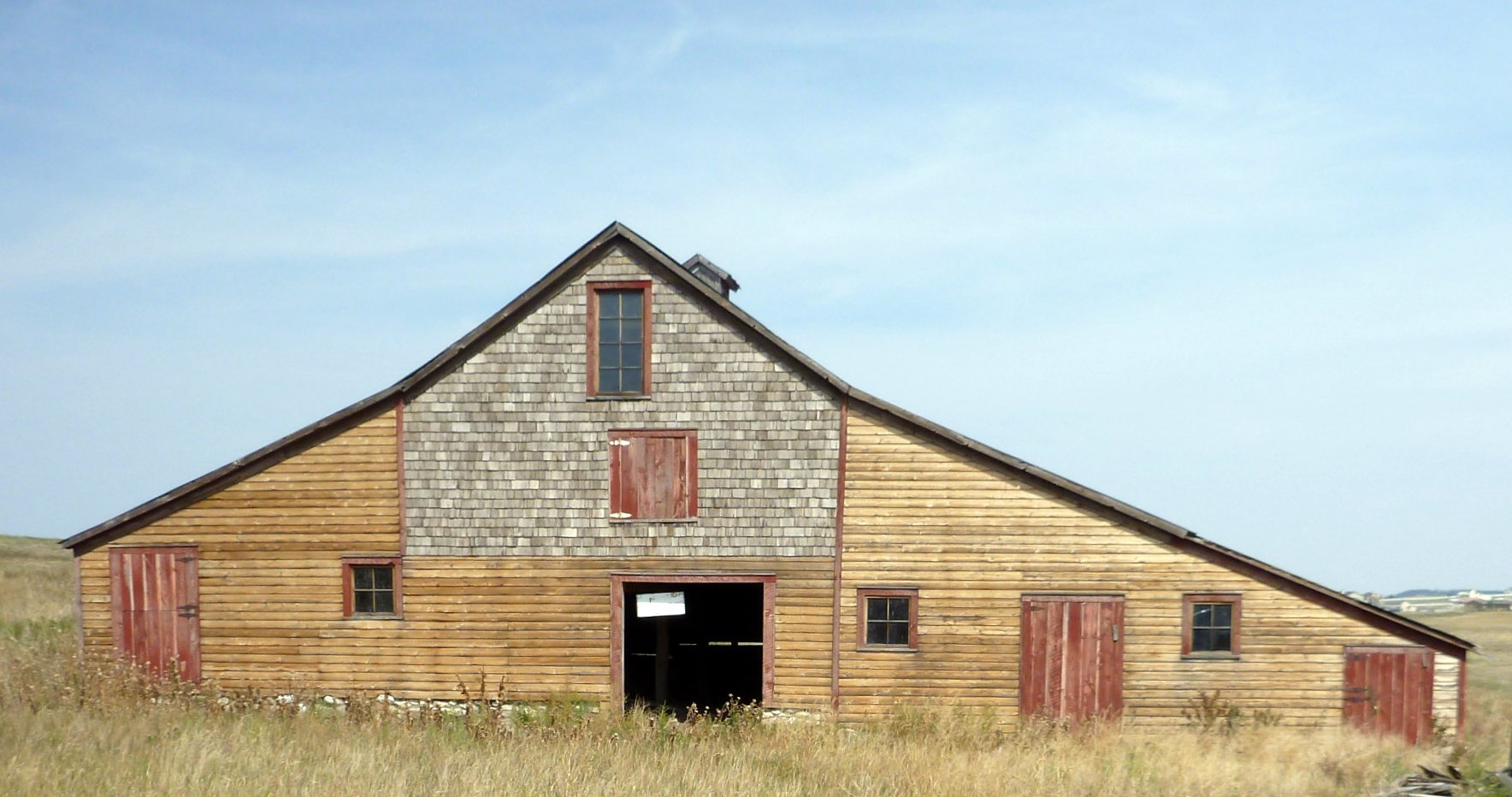

- Location within Colorado Location within the United States
- Nearest city: Black Forest, Colorado
- Coordinates: 39°4′18″N 104°41′25″W
- Area: less than one acre
- Built: 1885
- Built by: Evans, John G.
- NRHP reference No.: 04000624
- Added to NRHP: June 22, 2004

The J.G. Evans Barn is a historic barn on Hodgen Road in Black Forest, Colorado. It is a two-story wood-frame structure measuring 46 feet (14 m) by 60 feet (18 m), and is a typical Midwestern three-portal barn. It was built in 1885 by John Evans, an Iowa native who moved to the area in 1884. It is one of the few remaining barns from the early settlement and development period in Black Forest.

The complex is located in the hilly landscape with pine trees and includes the barn building, a windmill with missing blades, and a metallic tank. It is currently disused.

The barn was listed on the National Register of Historic Places in 2004.

== See also ==
- National Register of Historic Places listings in El Paso County, Colorado
