= Plaza Hotel (Colorado Springs, Colorado) =

- U.S. National Register of Historic Places
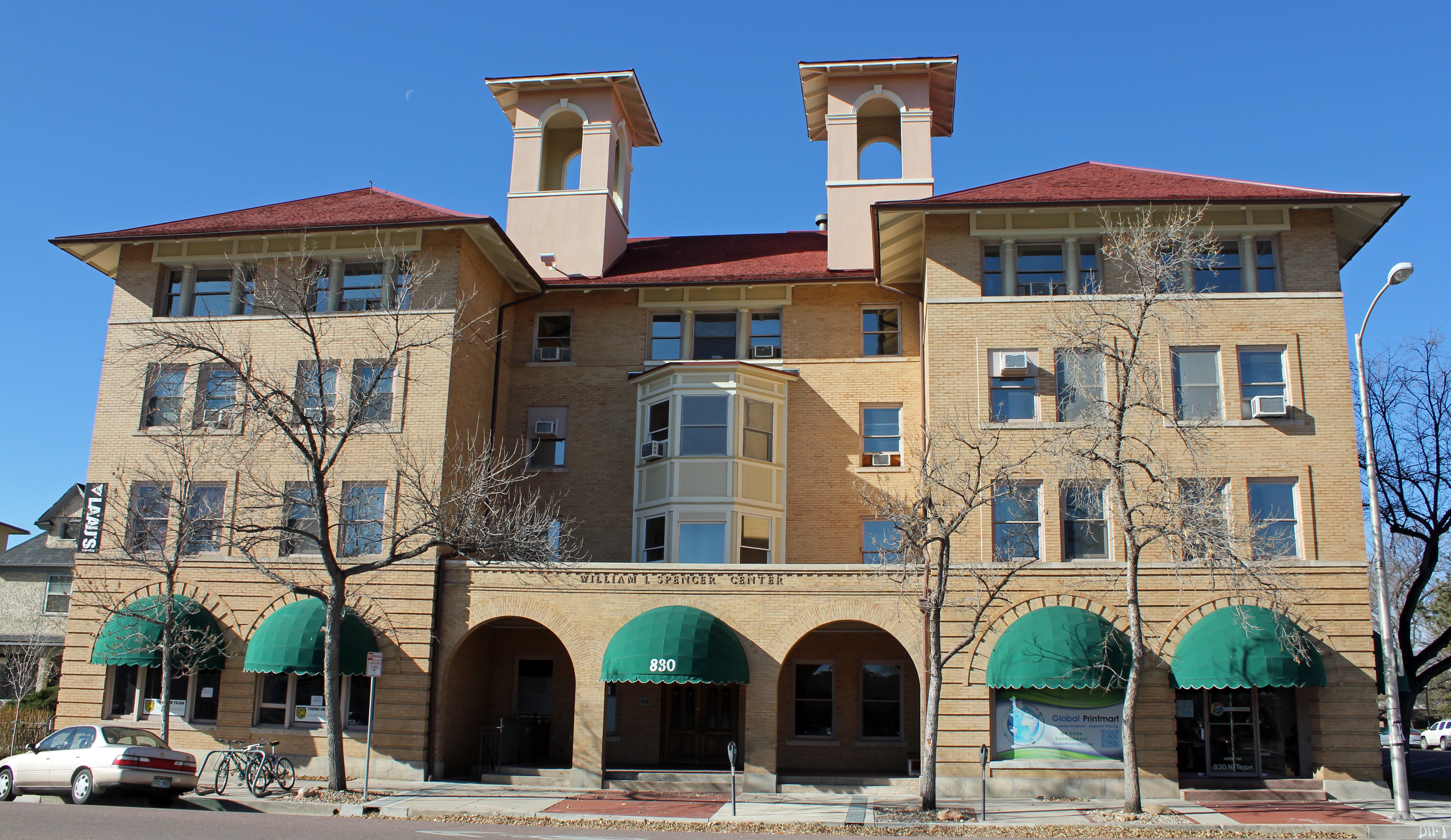

- Location within Colorado Location within the United States
- Location: 830 N. Tejon St., Colorado Springs, CO
- Coordinates: 38°50′46″N 104°49′21″W
- Built: 1901
- Architect: W. W. & G. F. Atkinson
- Architectural style: Renaissance/Mission Revival
- NRHP reference No.: 83001317
- Added to NRHP: September 1, 1983

The Plaza Hotel is a historic former hotel located in Colorado Springs, Colorado and built in the Renaissance/Mission Revival style by W. W. & G. F. Atkinson in 1901. The property is four stories tall and made of cream-colored pressed brick.

The building was listed on the National Register of Historic Places in 1983.

The hotel was purchased by Colorado College in 1991 and renamed as the William I. Spencer Center.

== See also ==
- National Register of Historic Places listings in El Paso County Colorado
