= Drennan School =

- U.S. National Register of Historic Places
- Colorado State Register of Historic Properties No. 5EP.4967
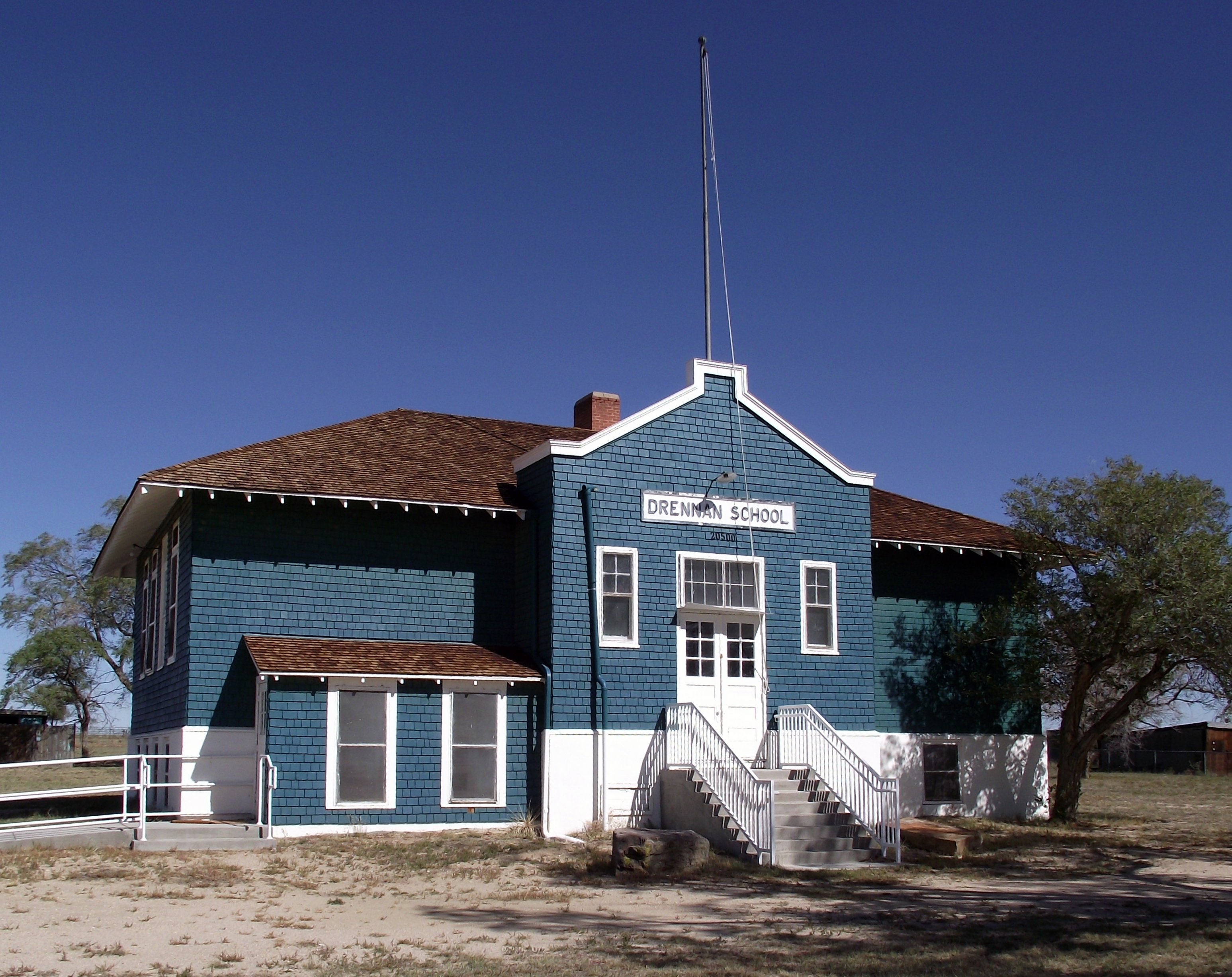

- Location within Colorado Location within the United States
- Location: 20500 Drennan Road, Colorado Springs, Colorado
- Coordinates: 38°45′08″N 104°26′57″W
- Built: about 1917
- NRHP reference No.: 08000290
- CSRHP No.: 5EP.4967

Significant dates
- Added to NRHP: April 16, 2008
- Designated CSRHP: September 30, 2007

The Drennan School, also known as the Drennan Community Building, is a historic building in Ellicott, near Colorado Springs, Colorado. The building was first owned by the Widefield School District in El Paso County. It is on the National Register of Historic Places.

== History ==
The rural schoolhouse, built about 1917, was used as a school until 1955. Grades 1 through 12 were taught in 2 classrooms. The building represents a turn-of-the-century shift from one-room schoolhouses to buildings with larger classrooms. Its new rural schoolhouse design included a hipped roof and clustered classroom windows. The school taught through the 12th grade, versus the 8th grade taught in the neighboring one-room schoolhouses. In 1922, the school had its first high school graduation.

It was named for William O. Drennan who provided the land and funds for the area's first schoolhouse, which was a one-room log building. Since its beginning and until the present day, the building has been used for community events.

It was the site of the area's post office from 1920 to 1951, and from 1918 to 1955 had El Paso County's first "wide-area telephone system" switchboard.

Students at the school produced their own newspaper. Girls and boys participated and won county and district basketball championships. In 1946, the girls won the state basketball championship. Enrollment began to decline in the ranching and farming community in the 1950s following a significant drought.

The school closed in 1955 and, in 1957, the school building was sold to the community, which wanted to preserve the historic integrity of the building and continue to use it for community events.

== Overview ==
The school building has classrooms and a library on the main floor. In the basement were bedrooms for the cook / caretaker and four teachers who resided in the school. There is also a kitchen, cafeteria, restroom and an office that was used by the switchboard operator.

It sits on a 2.65-acre lot, bordered by trees to break the wind, and has a gravel parking lot. Located on the dirt Drennan Road, it is surrounded by open land used for grazing. Within the treed perimeter are the single-story school, coal shed, cistern, 2 outhouses, a propane tank and a merry-go-round. It is believed that the 2 outhouses and the coal shed were Works Progress Administration projects.

== See also ==
- History of Colorado Springs, Colorado
