= Lindley-Johnson-Vanderhoof House =

Historic house in Colorado

- U.S. National Register of Historic Places
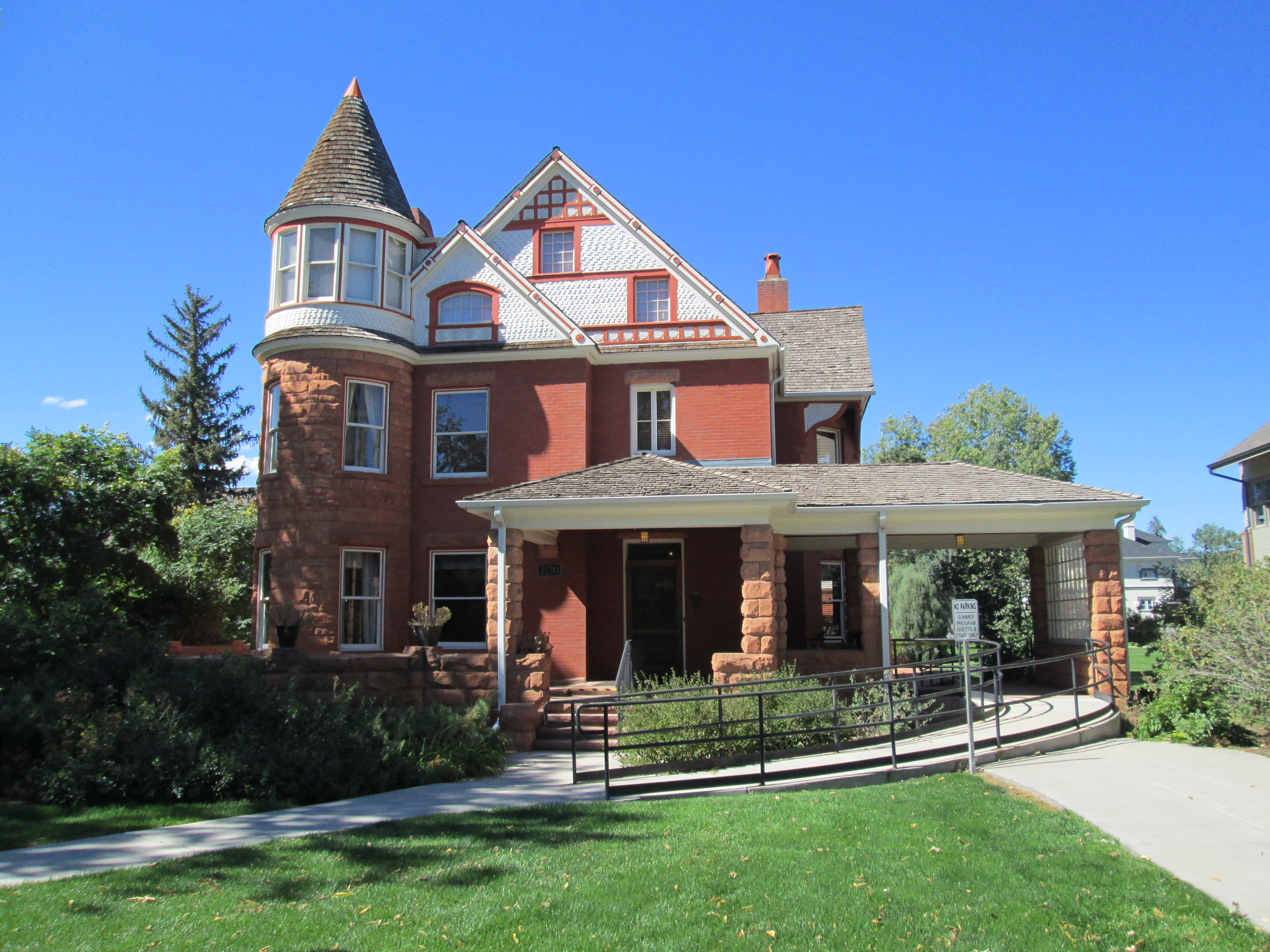

- Location within Colorado Location within the United States
- Location: 1130 N. Cascade Ave., Colorado Springs, Colorado
- Coordinates: 38°51′01″N 104°49′30″W
- Built: 1892
- Architect: William G. Fraser
- Architectural style: Queen Anne
- NRHP reference No.: 13000870
- Added to NRHP: December 3, 2013

Lindley-Johnson-Vanderhoof House is a three-story Queen Anne style brick house designed and built by William G. Fraser in 1892. The house is located in downtown Colorado Springs, Colorado and was used as a private residence from 1892 until 2000, when the Colorado College purchased the property. The house was listed on the National Register of Historic Places in 2013.

The property was listed due to the house being a unique and fine example of the Queen Anne style in Colorado Springs.
