= John Wolfe House =

- U.S. National Register of Historic Places
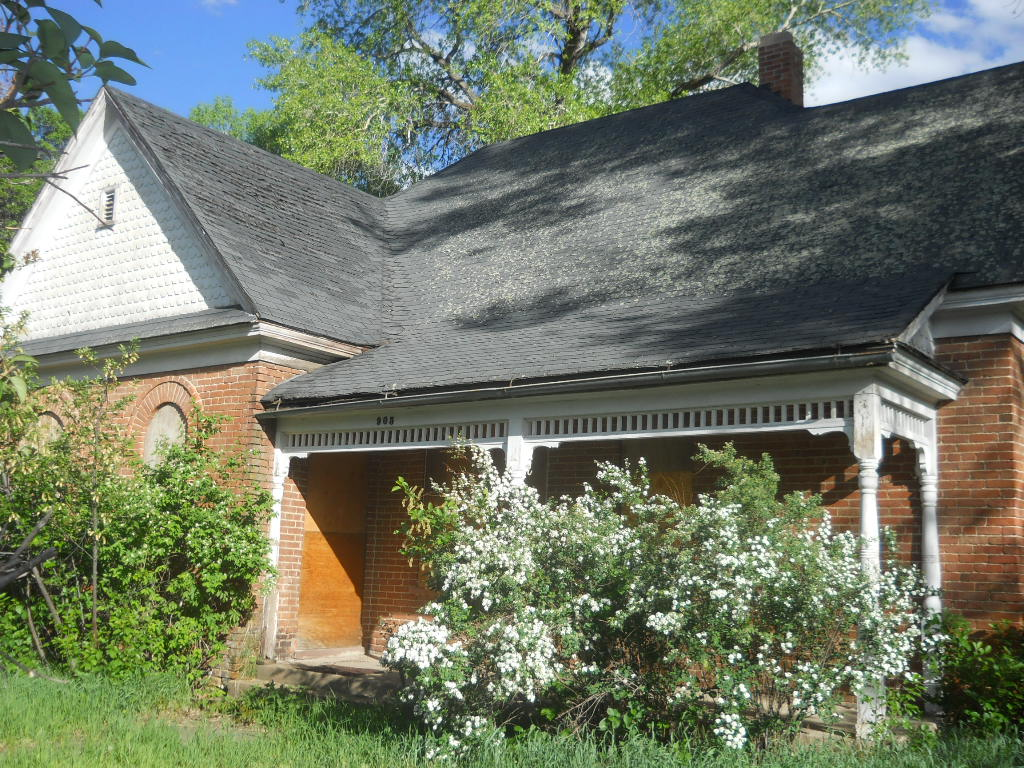
- The John Wolfe House in 2013.

- Location within Colorado
- Location: 905 W. Cheyenne Rd.
- Coordinates: 38°48′0″N 104°50′35″W
- Built: 1894
- NRHP reference No.: 12001193
- Added to NRHP: January 23, 2013

The John Wolfe House is a historic house on 905 W. Cheyenne Rd., Colorado Springs, Colorado that was owned by homesteader and prospector John Wolfe. It is on the National Register of Historic Places listings in El Paso County, Colorado.

The house was built in 1894 and is currently abandoned. All of the windows are boarded up (seen on picture).
