= Dodge-Hamlin House =

- U.S. National Register of Historic Places
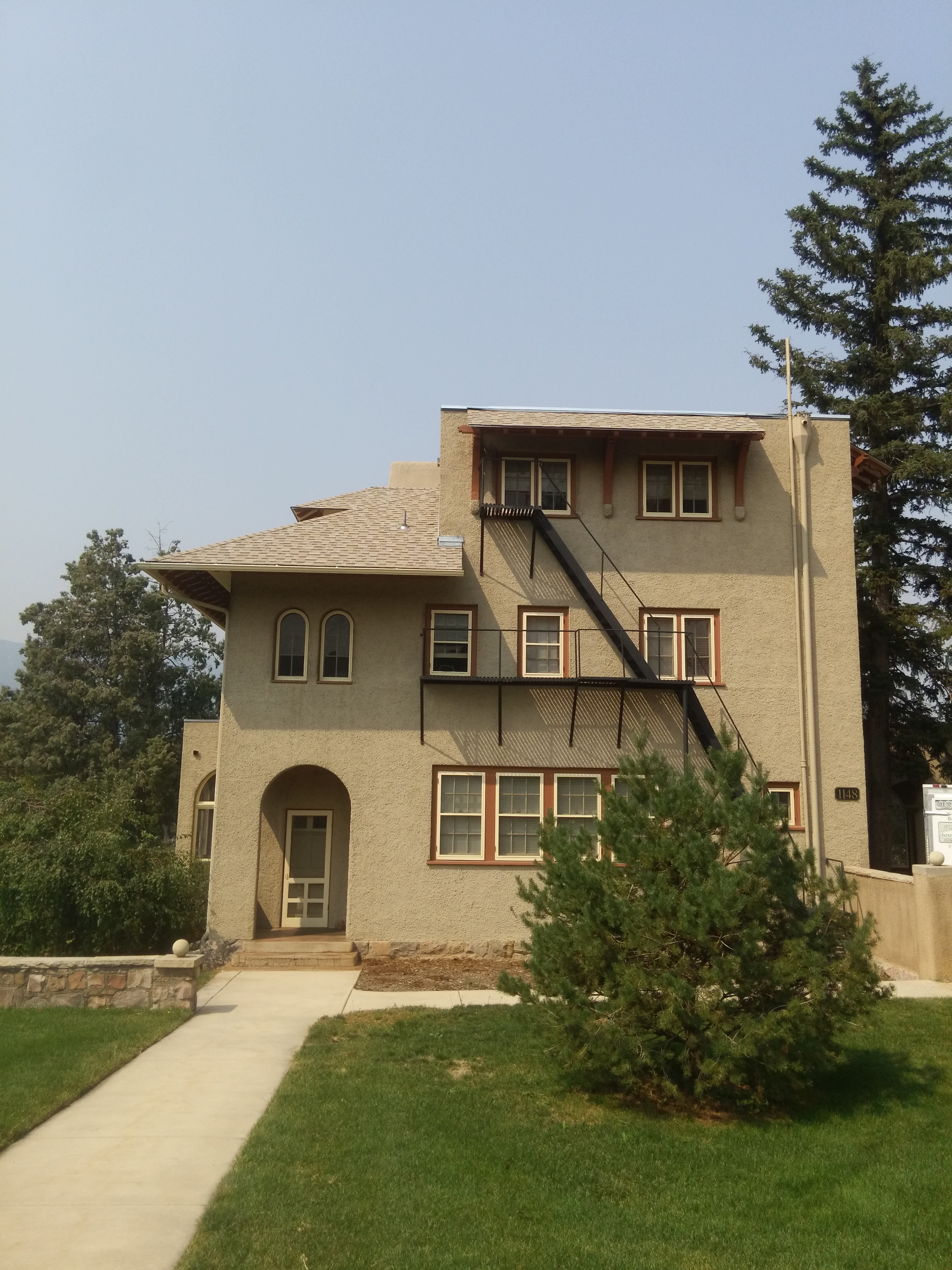

- Location within Colorado Location within the United States
- Location: 1148 N. Cascade Ave./1122 Wood Ave., Colorado Springs, Colorado
- Coordinates: 38°51′04″N 104°49′36″W
- Built: 1916
- Architect: Nicolaas van den Arend
- Architectural style: Mission Revival
- NRHP reference No.: 14000968 Dodge-Hamlin House in Colorado Springs, Colorado, was designed by Nicolaas van den Arend an
- Added to NRHP: December 3, 2014

Dodge-Hamlin House was designed by Nicolaas van der Arend and built by Clarence Phelps Dodge in 1916, and is located in downtown Colorado Springs, Colorado. It was listed on the National Register of Historic Places in 2014.

The house was used as a private residence from 1916 until 1943, when it was incorporated into the Colorado College campus. It is an example of the Mission Revival architectural style, and is listed due to its historic use in the Colorado College campus, and its use by two significant newspaper publishers and editors in the city: Clarence Phelps Dodge, and Clarence Clark Hamlin.
