= Chadbourn Spanish Gospel Mission =

Historic church in Colorado, United States

- U.S. National Register of Historic Places
- Colorado State Register of Historic Properties No. 5EP.643
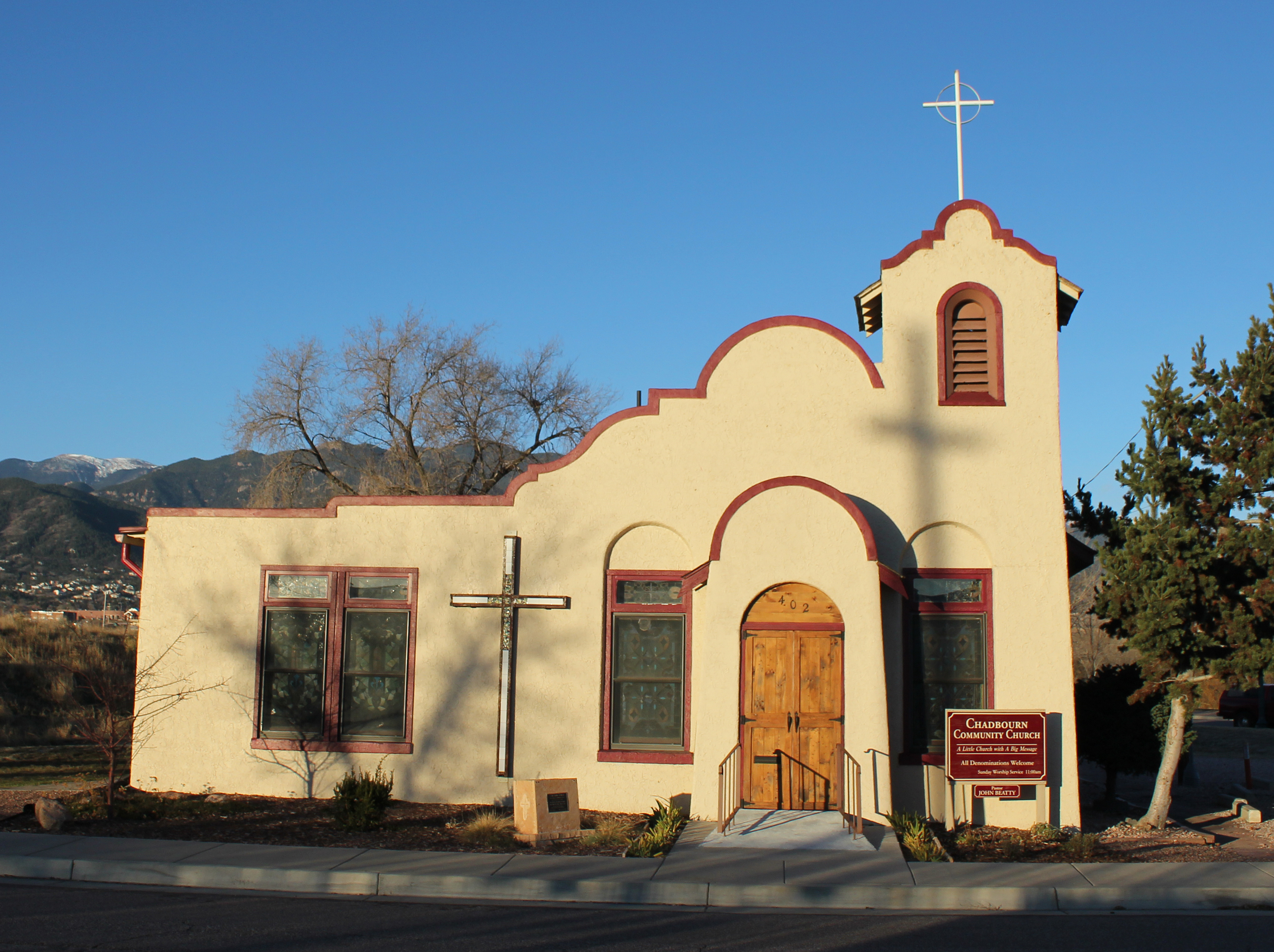

- Location within Colorado Location within the United States
- Location: 402 S. Conejos Street, Colorado Springs, Colorado
- Coordinates: 38°49′41.85″N 104°49′53.88″W
- Built: 1910
- Architect: Raymond C. Whitlock
- Architectural style: Mission Revival
- NRHP reference No.: 08001316
- CSRHP No.: 5EP.643

Significant dates
- Added to NRHP: January 14, 2009
- Designated CSRHP: January 14, 2009

The Chadbourn Spanish Gospel Mission is a Mission Revival building in the Conejos District of Colorado Springs, Colorado. The building is on the National Register of Historic Places.

Beginning in 1928 the mission church provided religious, educational, sports, and mission services to the residents of the Conejos District. It was supported by the Colorado Springs Ministerial Association, which formed an advisory board which helped solicit and provide funding and teachers for the church.

It was founded by Ruth Chadbourn, a Presbyterian nurse who had moved to Colorado Springs for her health after having served as a missionary in Costa Rica.

== Conejos District ==
The Conejos District was an area in Colorado Springs that was home to a Mexican community beginning at the turn of the 20th century who had moved to the area to work at the nearby Denver & Rio Grande Railroad, mills and mines. Many members of the Hispanic community came from the San Luis Valley. They moved into an area that had been home to people of Scandinavian and Jewish heritage who moved to other areas of the city.

The district lies between Colorado Avenue and Mill Street to the north and south. The eastern and western borders are the Denver & Rio Grande Railroad yard and Monument Creek. Families lived in frame houses on narrow lots and there were stores in the neighborhood to serve the community.

The Chadbourn Spanish Gospel Mission is the only structure that remains from the district.

== Church and mission ==
Built in 1910, it was a frame building used first as a grocery store. It began being used as a mission in 1930, and was named the Spanish Gospel Mission. The mission was founded by missionary Ruth Chadbourn, who worked in Costa Rica and moved to Colorado Springs in the 1920s for her health. It was created to support the community with a high crime rate and poor living conditions. The building was rented in 1930 and purchased in 1934 by Chadbourn and trustees of the mission. Members of Protestant Colorado Springs churches formed an advisory board to help manage the finances of the organization and arrange for funds for the mission. Chadbourn died in 1936 and subsequently the mission was named for her.

After it was renovated in 1939 to 1940 to the Spanish Mission style, it was a non-denominational church and mission that helped community members and was a community and education center. A bell tower donated by Colorado College and curvilinear parapets were added to the church and, among other modifications, it was stuccoed. The First United Methodist Church donated stained glass panels. Its architecture has been described as follows:

The building’s Mission Revival style is exemplified in its square bell tower, curvilinear parapets, overhanging eaves, exposed rafter tails, arches, and stucco finish.

Church services were performed in Spanish and English. The church held Bible and Sunday School classes. Boy Scouts and Girl Scouts met at the church. Children could play on the church's basketball and baseball teams. Adult education courses in music, sewing and English language. It provided food and Christmas gifts to neighborhood children and was a place for community events.

The church was long a center for the Conejos district, with the pastors often taking the role of advocate for the Hispanic community in Colorado Springs. An article in the April 29, 1942 issue of The Colorado Springs Evening Telegraph reported that the Rev. Jose Guzman, the pastor of the congregation, had issued a statement strongly condemning the discrimination which was being experienced by the many Hispanic workers who had come to Colorado Springs to build Camp Carson, only to encounter "No Mexicans Allowed" signs in many of the city businesses. The final paragraph eloquently expresses Pastor Guzman's frustrations: "It is said that between four and five hundred Spanish-Americans from New Mexico have already given their lives in the Pacific for the U.S.A. And what a profound gratitude is shown by those who are here mistreating, perhaps the brothers, perhaps the fathers of those that have died for our beloved America. Some of them have asked me: "How come we are their equals in the war front, and cannot be their equals in the lunch counter or the beer joint?'"

Following World War II, the church continued to advocate for the families of the Conejos neighborhood. In an article in the August 17, 1951 issue of the Colorado Springs Free Press, the pastor of the church, Dr. Harry Corney was quoted as follows, "The South Conejos Street district is a black mark against the Colorado Springs community. We refer to our friends as 'American Mexican Spanish people' since most of them are American citizens. The people of this city should see how their neighbors on South Conejos Street are forced to live."

An article was written in The Gazette said of the mission:

This neighborhood badly needs such work for there are many children and youth crowded into small houses with no playground except the street. Character-building agencies are much cheaper than the cost of juvenile delinquency.... This enterprise has shown what inter-denominational and inter-racial understanding and good will can do.

In 1954, the homes and buildings in the district were demolished and the property was used for commercial and light industrial purposes. In 2005, America the Beautiful Park was completed across Ciminio Drive from the church, at the corner of Conejos and Ciminio Drive. The mission has remained and conducts weekly church services. It is no longer funded by other congregations. Its congregation includes the grandchildren and children of the earlier church members.

In 2008, The Gazette reported that the congregation was slowly growing and had plans of expanding the church building. A rezoning of the building allows the church to obtain grants for the construction. Becoming listed with the National Register of Historic Places helps to ensure the historic preservation of the church.

== Walking tour ==
Chadbourn Spanish Gospel Mission is one of the properties on the Southwest Downtown walking tour in Colorado Springs.

== See also ==
- History of Colorado Springs, Colorado
