= City Hall of Old Colorado City =

- U.S. National Register of Historic Places
- Colorado State Register of Historic Properties No. 5EP.220
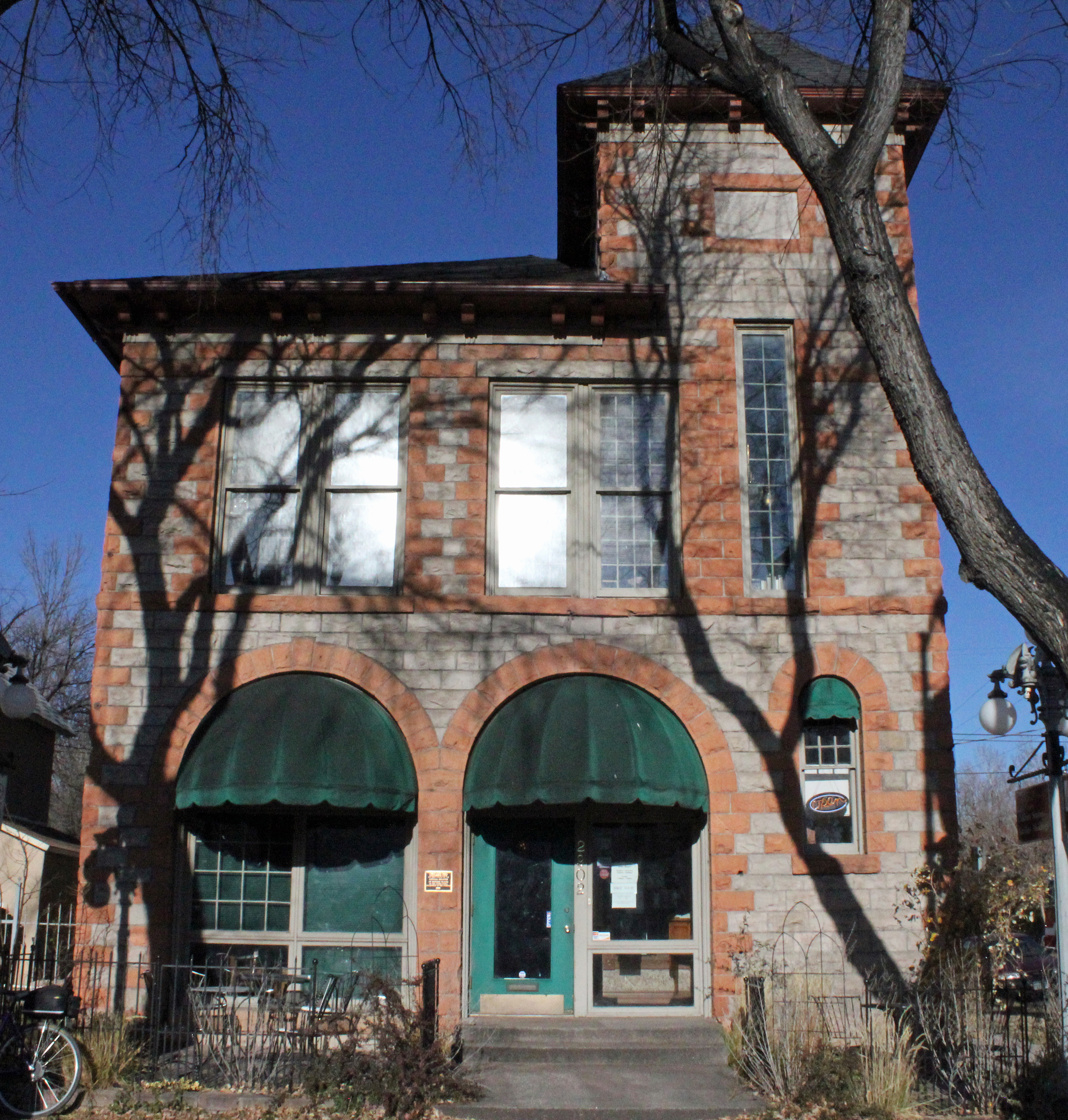

- Location within Colorado Location within the United States
- Location: 2902 W. Colorado Avenue, Colorado Springs, Colorado
- Coordinates: 38°51′4″N 104°52′7″W
- Built: 1888
- Architectural style: Richardsonian Romanesque Revival
- NRHP reference No.: 82002300
- CSRHP No.: 5EP.220

Significant dates
- Added to NRHP: June 3, 1982
- Designated CSRHP: June 3, 1982

The City Hall of Old Colorado City is a Richardsonian Romanesque Revival building from the Old Colorado City of Colorado Springs, Colorado. It was a city hall after it was built in 1888, but shortly after was used for other purposes including Hibbits Antique & Furniture Store. The building is on the National Register of Historic Places.

== History ==
It is a 2 storied building with a tower made of rough-textured stone and brick. The front of the built has 2 wagon doors under 2 masonry arches. Besides city offices, it was also first a jail and firehouse. The tower originally probably had a bell to alarm residents of the fire. It was built for Old Colorado City that was incorporated in 1887 at a cost of $5,000.

Most of the brothels and saloons were located between the 2400 and 2700 blocks of Colorado Avenue, often requiring hiring of transportation to transport arrested individuals to the jail. A new building was built at 26th and Cucharras in the late 1880s to more conveniently place prisoners in jail.

The former city hall served as a school from 1892 to 1902. It was called Ward School and Whittier School. It was then a hotel. The building was a bottling plant and garage in the 1930s and 1940s. Since then, the building has been used for commercial buildings.

== See also ==
- History of Colorado Springs, Colorado
