= Giddings Building =

- U.S. National Register of Historic Places
- Colorado State Register of Historic Properties No. 5EP.527
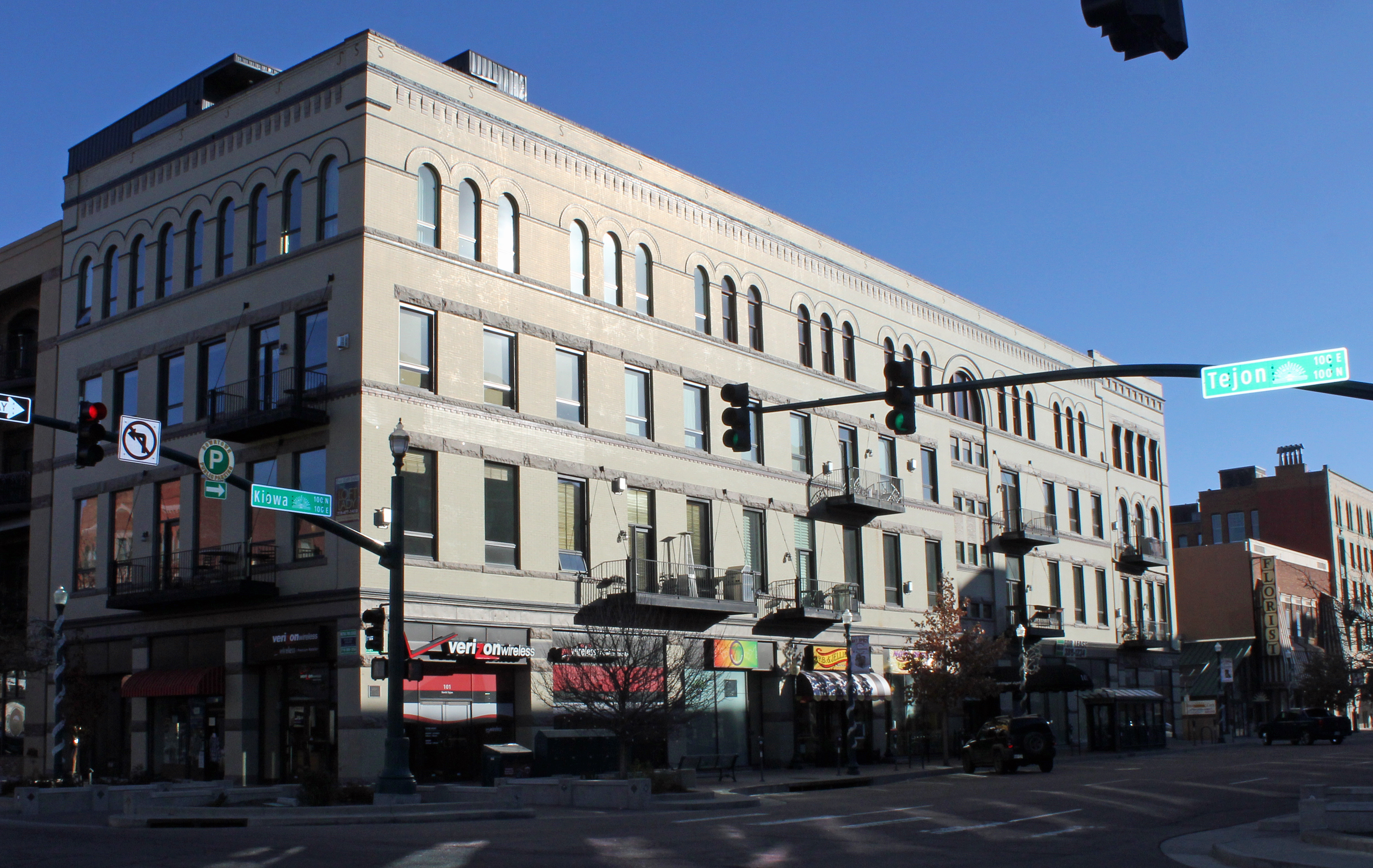

- Location within Colorado
- Location: 101 N. Tejon Street, Colorado Springs, Colorado
- Coordinates: 38°50′08″N 104°50′03″W
- Built: 1898
- NRHP reference No.: 83001294
- CSRHP No.: 5EP.527
- Added to NRHP: April 21, 1983

Giddings Building is a four-story building in downtown Colorado Springs. When it was built in 1898, it was the tallest building in Colorado Springs. It used was a department store owned by the Giddings family until 1950. It has been on the National Register of Historic Places since April 21, 1983.
