= Keithley Log Cabin Development District =

Historic district in Colorado, United States

- U.S. National Register of Historic Places
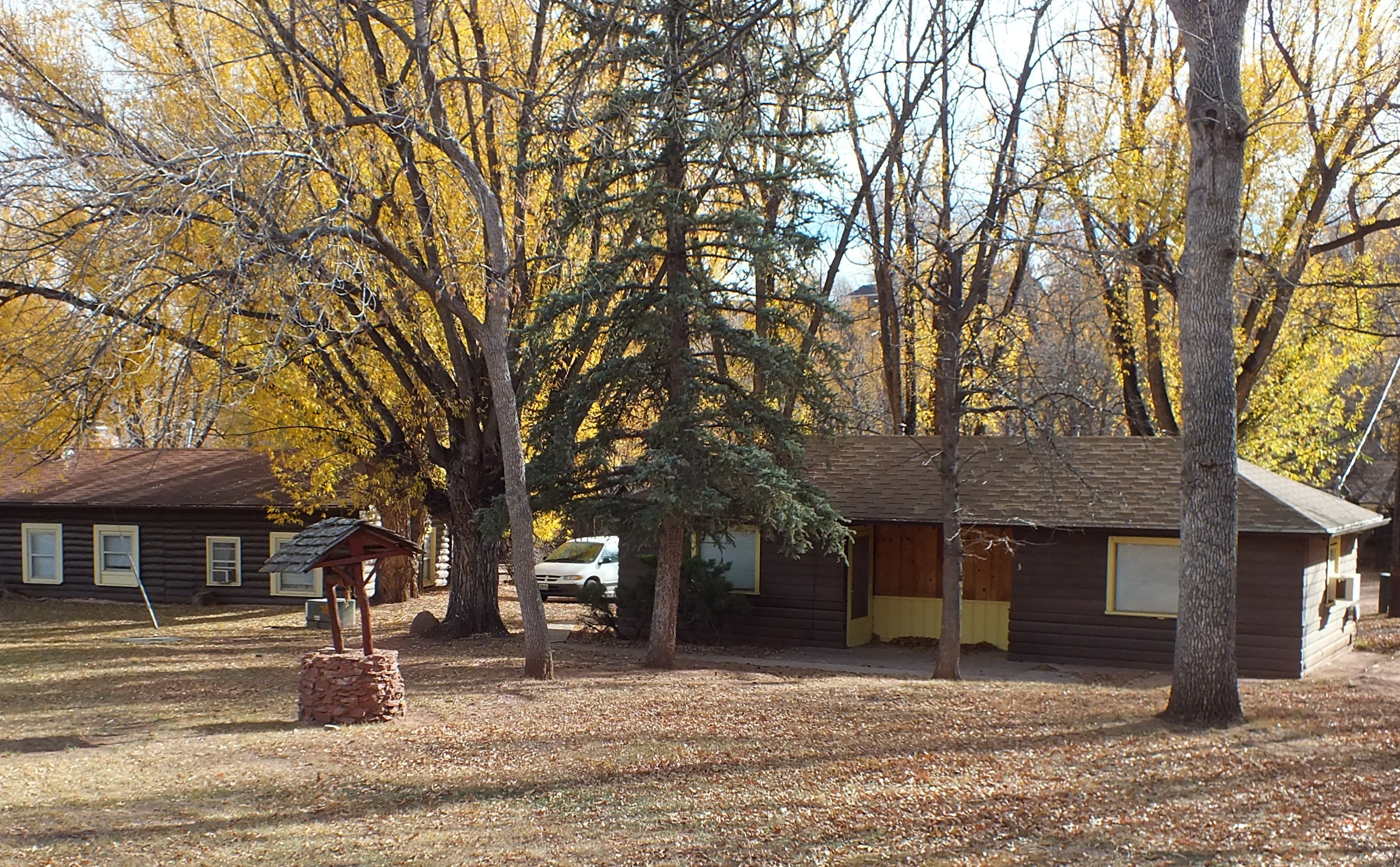

- Location within Colorado Location within the United States
- Location: Between Santa Fe Place, Crystal Road, and Spur Road, Manitou Springs, Colorado
- Coordinates: 38°51′13″N 104°53′59″W
- NRHP reference No.: 82001016
- Added to NRHP: 1982

Keithley Log Cabin Development District is a historic camp and health resort located on between Santa Fe Place, Crystal Road and Spur Road in Manitou Springs, Colorado. It is on the National Register of Historic Places.

== Overview ==
Two individuals, McLaughlin and Keithley, created a resort development of log cabins off of Crystal Park Road in Manitou Springs in the early 1900s. The development includes 27 log cottages in a secluded, rustic and wooded setting. The one-story cabins, built between 1920 and 1959, have cobblestone foundations, chimneys and walls. Sixteen of the buildings were built in the 1920s. They are located on Spur, Chelton, Crystal Park and Short roads. The cabins are now full-time or summer residences of private home owners.

Six of the cabins were built exclusively by Everhard Keithley. He created a 10-acre wooded enclave of cabins from a "rocky, hilly old goat pasture". His granddaughter, Nancy Galles Bower, presides over the Keithley Log Cabin National Historic District and owns six cabins.

== Everard Keithley ==
Everard S. Keithley worked for the Pike National Forest and from 1913 to 1946 oversaw the planting of 30 million trees. From 1926 to 1946 he was forest superintendent and was responsible for developing tree nurseries, building Rampart Range Road, fighting to open Gold Camp Road to the public and reforesting areas that had been stripped due to wildfires, logging or mining.

== See also ==
- Manitou Springs Historic District
- List of Manitou Springs Historic District buildings
