= YWCA Building (Colorado Springs, Colorado) =

- Y.W.C.A. Building
- U.S. National Register of Historic Places
- Colorado State Register of Historic Properties No. 5EP.198
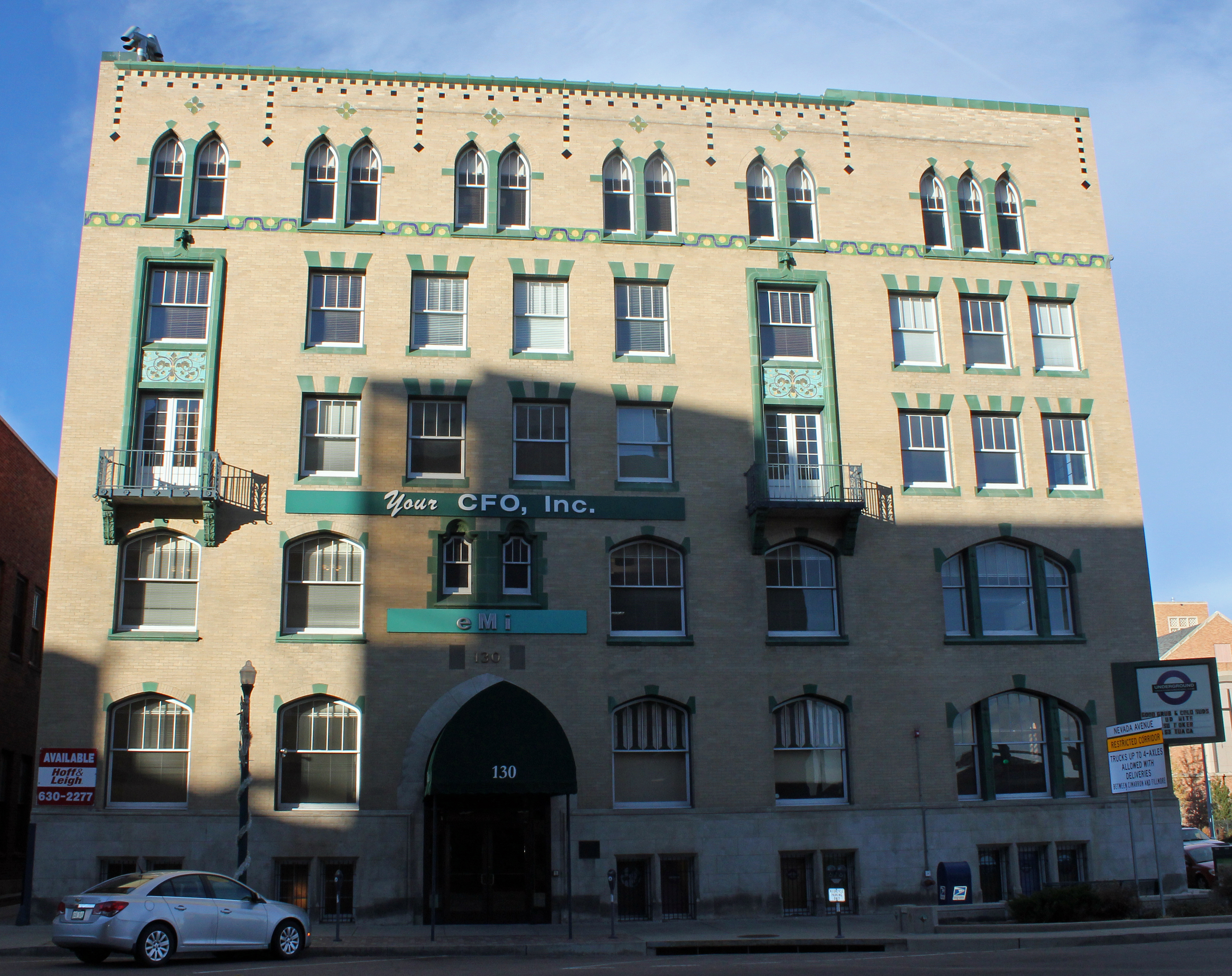

- Location within Colorado
- Location: 130 E. Kiowa Street, Colorado Springs, Colorado
- Coordinates: 38°50′08″N 104°49′17″W
- Built: 1912/1913
- Architect: Nicholas Van den Arend
- NRHP reference No.: 79000602
- CSRHP No.: 5EP.198
- Added to NRHP: September 10, 1979

The Y.W.C.A. Building is a 5 1/2-story building on 130 E. Kiowa Street in Colorado Springs, Colorado. Built in 1913, it was added to the National Register of Historic Places on September 10, 1979. Its estimated height is 66.85 ft.

In 2018, Perry Sanders purchased the building.
