= Peggy Hill Cabin =

Historic cabin in Colorado

- U.S. National Register of Historic Places
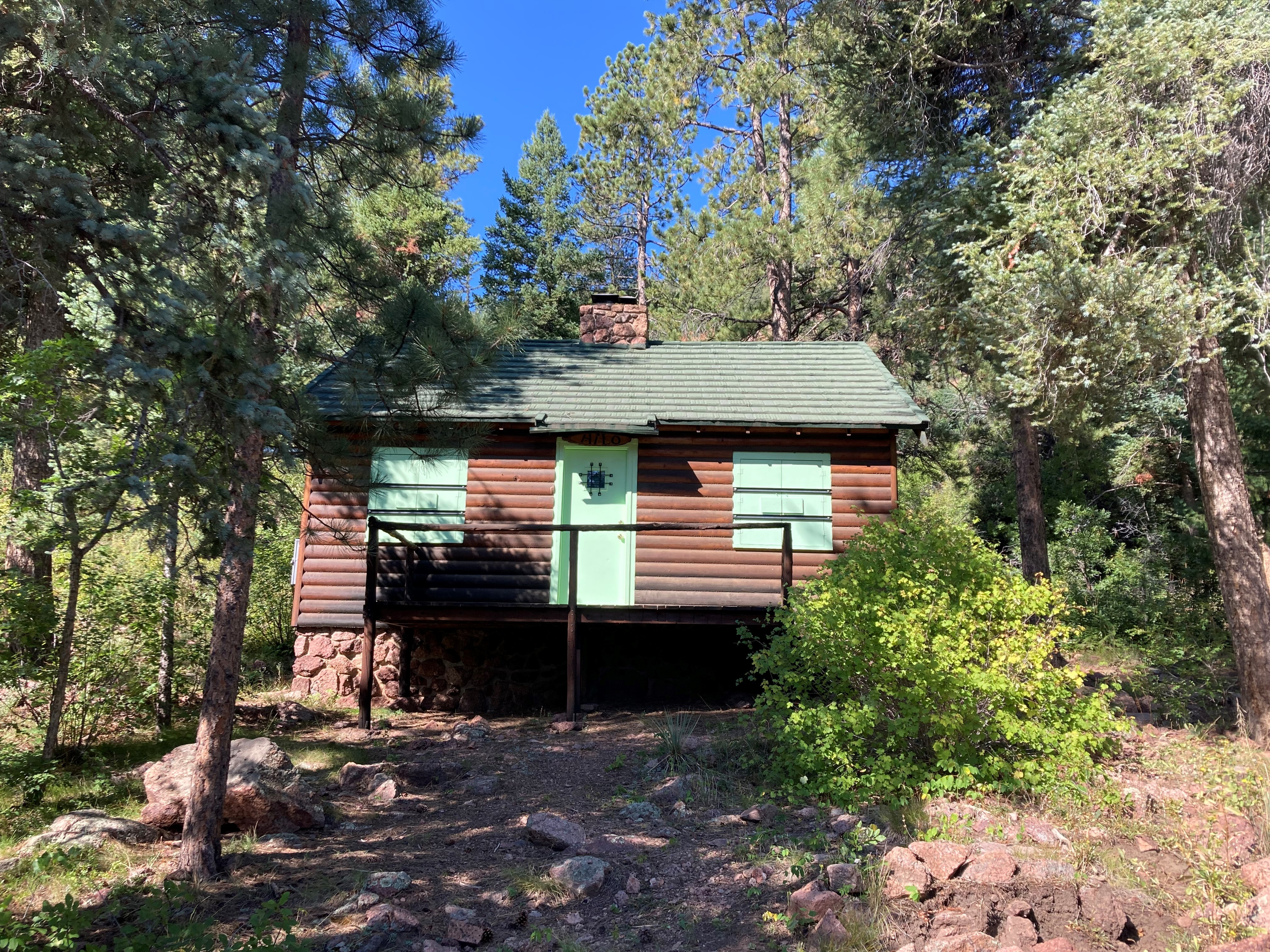

- Location within Colorado
- Location: 5250 Eisenhower Drive, Palmer Lake, Colorado
- Coordinates: 39°06′28″N 104°55′31″W
- Area: less than one acre
- Architectural style: Rustic
- NRHP reference No.: 100011505
- Added to NRHP: July 28, 2025

The Peggy Hill Cabin in Colorado was built in 1932 exemplifying the style of the “rustic architectural” movement, characterized by its natural setting and its use of log and stone for building materials. It is at 5250 Eisenhower Drive in the vicinity of Palmer Lake. The Peggy Hill Cabin was added to the National Register of Historic Places on July 28, 2025 (Registration No. 100011505), for its architectural significance and as an example of a recreation residence occupying Forest Service land.

Rustic architecture is typically associated with mountain-area tourist lodges and the buildings and structures constructed by the U.S. Forest Service.

The Peggy Hill Cabin is the only cabin constructed on the site of the Forest Service’s Palmer Lake Summer Home Group. The cabin is one-story with a loft and is located west of the Town of Palmer Lake, Colorado, in the Pike National Forest, Pikes Peak Ranger District. The cabin is located near the south bank of Monument Creek in Limbaugh Canyon, below the north face of Raspberry Mountain.
