= Second Midland School =

- U.S. National Register of Historic Places
- Colorado State Register of Historic Properties No. 5EP.201
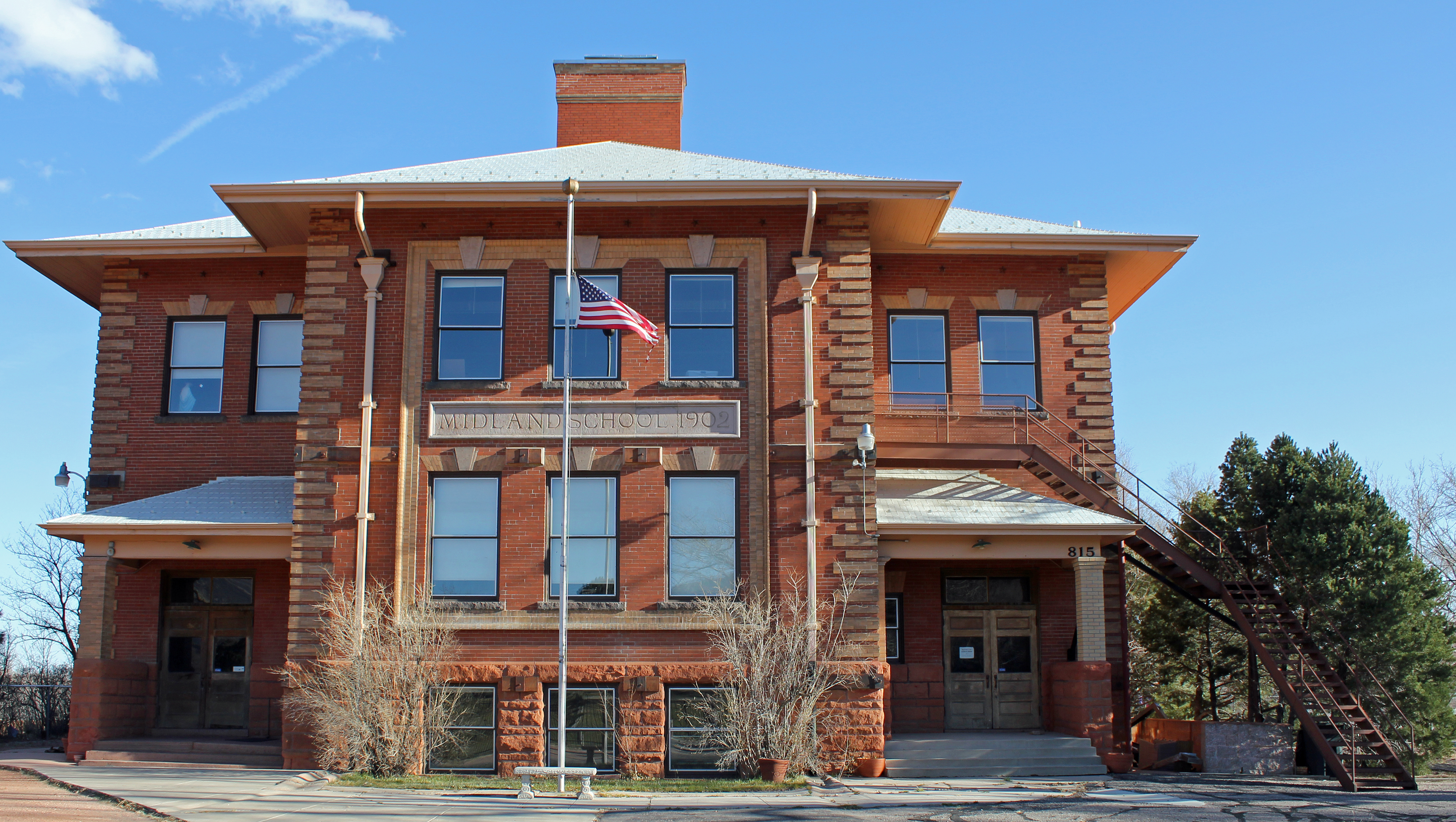

- Location within Colorado
- Location: 815 S. 25th St.
- Coordinates: 38°50′27″N 104°52′02″W
- Built: 1902
- NRHP reference No.: 80000895
- CSRHP No.: 5EP.201
- Added to NRHP: September 12, 1980

The Second Midland School is a former school in Colorado Springs. Built in 1902, it was added to the National Register of Historic Places (NRHP) on September 12, 1980. The building is three stories tall and is made of red sandstone and brick.

The building was fully renovated with assistance of 25 High School students and localcraftsmen. The existing school rooms (including restrooms and the stage and library) blackboards and flagpole were all retained and used.

The Eskanos later sold the property to a group that planned to convert it into a Catholic grade school. The school property was purchased by L Ducett and was used as an office building for her engineering firm. Today, the school is a creative hub in the community and home to Harmonic Garden School of Music, salon concerts and more.
