= Stockbridge House =

Historic house in Colorado, United States

- U.S. National Register of Historic Places
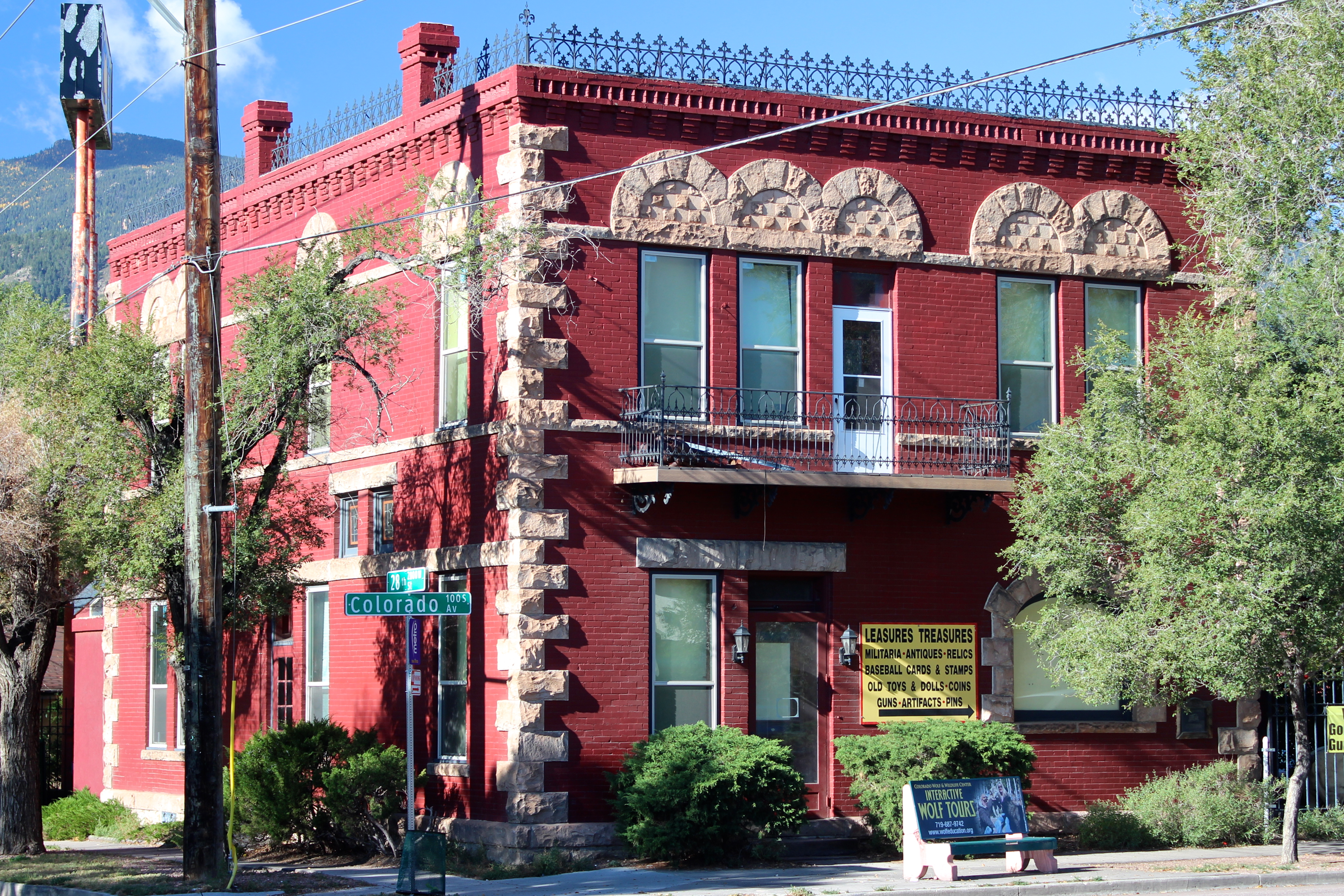

- Location within Colorado Location within the United States
- Location: 2801 W. Colorado Ave., Colorado Springs, Colorado
- Coordinates: 38°51′0″N 104°52′1″W
- Area: 0.1 acres (0.040 ha)
- Built: 1891
- Architectural style: Western Victorian
- NRHP reference No.: 80000896
- Added to NRHP: September 11, 1980

The Stockbridge House, in Colorado Springs, Colorado, was built in 1891. It was listed on the National Register of Historic Places in 1980. It has also been known as the Amarillo Motel.
