= Pioneers Cabin (Edmonton) =

Historic building in Edmonton, Alberta

Bison Lodge (FKA-Pioneers Cabin)
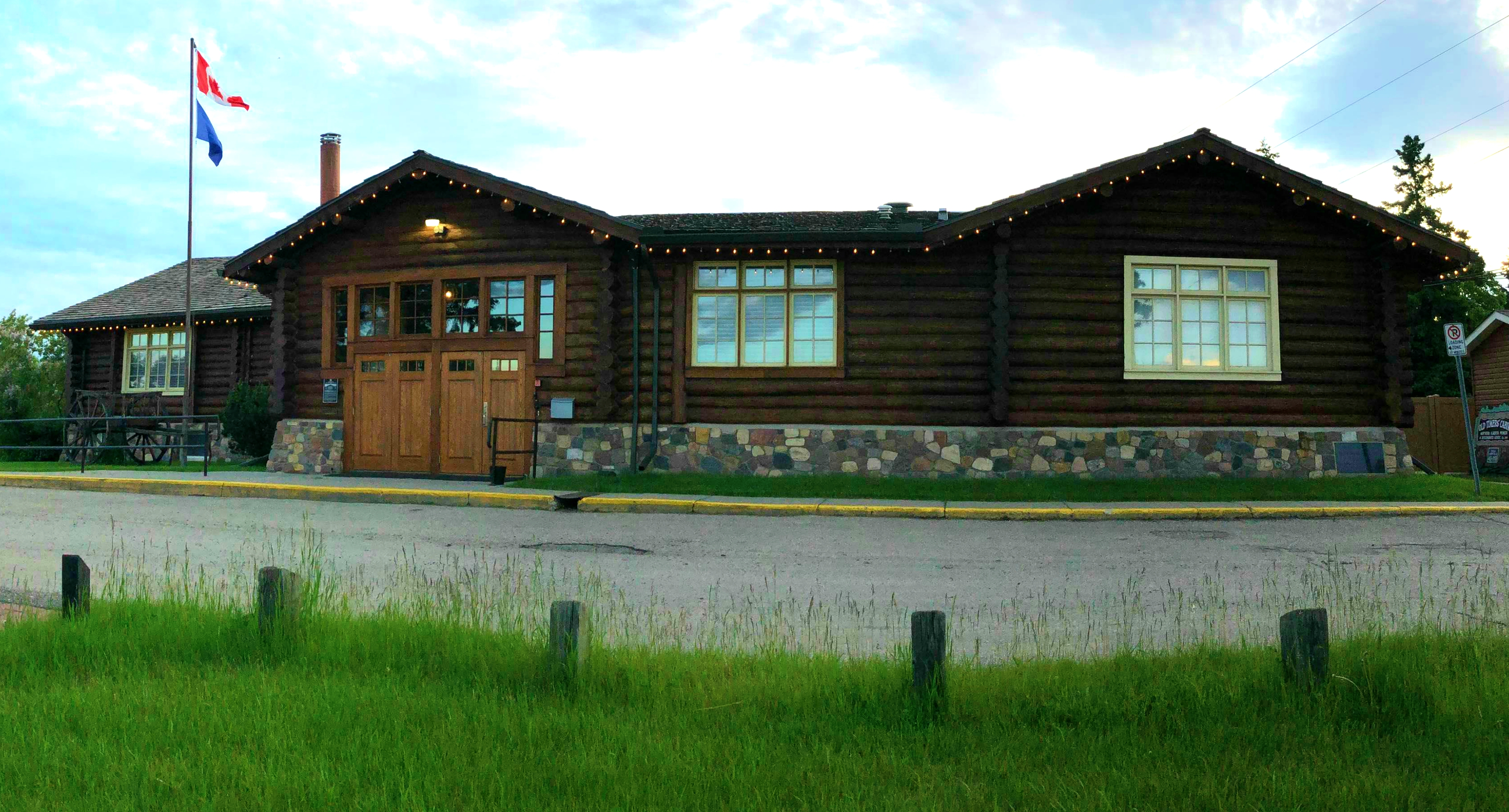
- Bison Lodge in 2020

General information
- Location: Edmonton, Alberta, 9430 Scona Road NW
- Coordinates: 53.5343484°N 113.4847326°W
- Opened: 1959

Website
- https://www.pioneerscabin.com/

The Bison Lodge of Edmonton (formerly known as the Pioneers Cabin, Or Old Timers' Cabin) is a historic building in Edmonton, Alberta, Canada.

== History ==
The cabin first opened in 1959 under the name "The Old Timers' Cabin." The structure is a natural log house with a stone chimney, a poplar floor, cedar shingles, and spruce window frames.

The cabin was built by a 76-year-old log specialist named Hobart Dowler for the Northern Alberta Pioneers and Descendants Association (NAPDA). The building was built from spruce logs that came from Dowler's Pigeon Lake property. With just an axe, the logs were fit together using a saddle notch, creating a water tight fit without additional chinking. The logs were measured, assembled and numbered at Pigeon Lake before being disassembled and remade on the building site in Edmonton.

The cabin is located in the North Saskatchewan river valley on Scona Hill, on a site which had been leveled to give fill to the Low Level Bridge. The style was intentionally picked for its status as a pioneer symbol, mirroring the Northern Alberta Pioneers and Descendants' association with the past. The association was founded in 1894 by a number of prominent Edmontonians such as for example, James Gibbons, Donald Ross Sr., John McDougall, and Harrison Young.

== Events ==
As of 2024, paid events such as weddings and corporate meetings financially support the maintenance of the designated historic resource (Bison Lodge), and the creation of community and cultural events at Bison Lodge.
