= Navajo Hogan =

- U.S. National Register of Historic Places
- Colorado State Register of Historic Properties
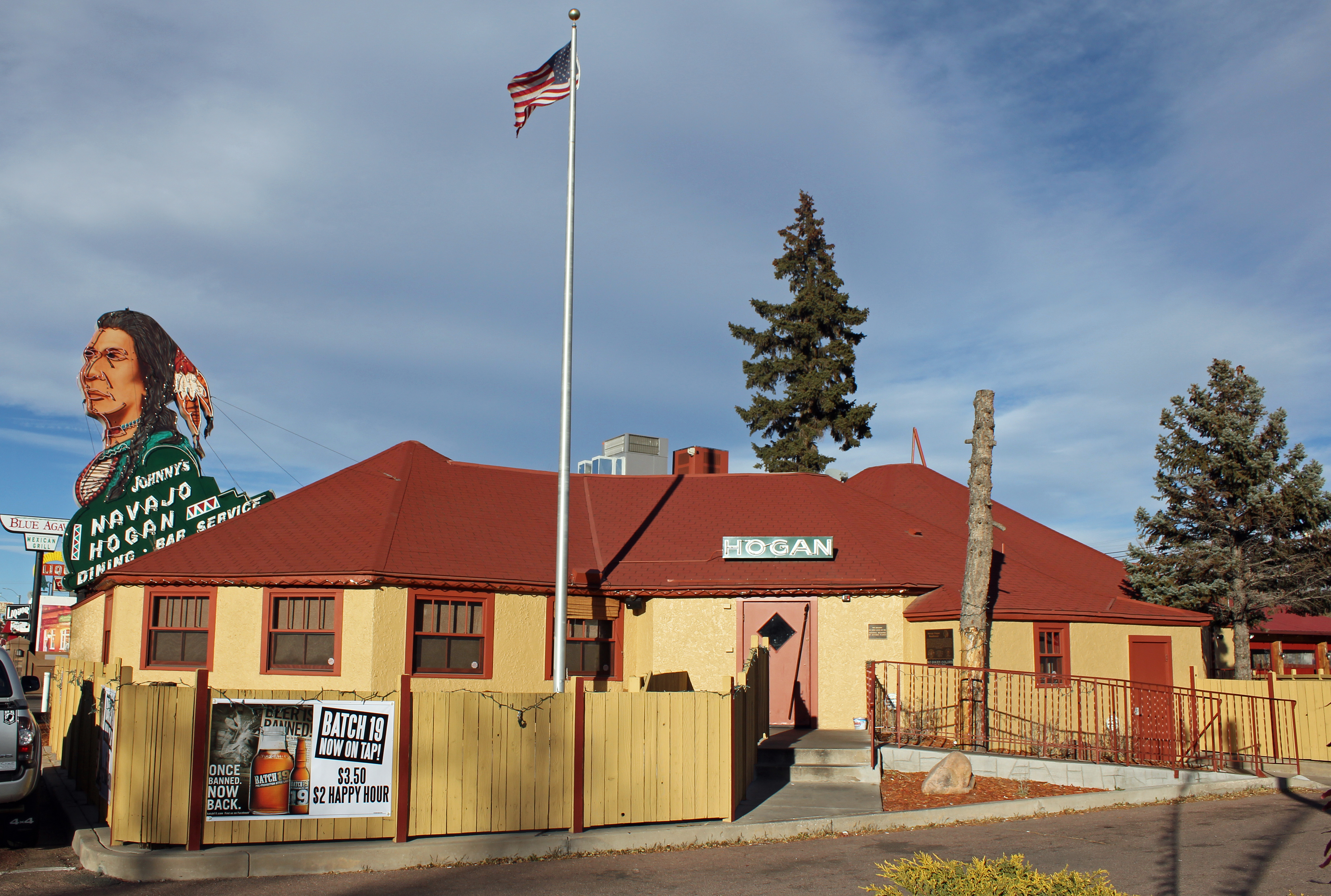
- Location: 2817 N. Nevada Ave., Colorado Springs, Colorado
- Coordinates: 38°52′20″N 104°49′08″W
- Built: 1935
- Architectural style: 1930s Roadside
- NRHP reference No.: 90001420
- Added to NRHP: September 13, 1990

The Navajo Hogan is a historic building and restaurant located on 2817 N. Nevada Ave. in Colorado Springs, Colorado, United States. It was added to the National Register of Historic Places on September 13, 1990.

The building is currently a closed restaurant.
