= Pioneer Cabin (Colorado Springs, Colorado) =

Historic house in Colorado, United States

- U.S. National Register of Historic Places
- Colorado State Register of Historic Properties No. 5EP.182
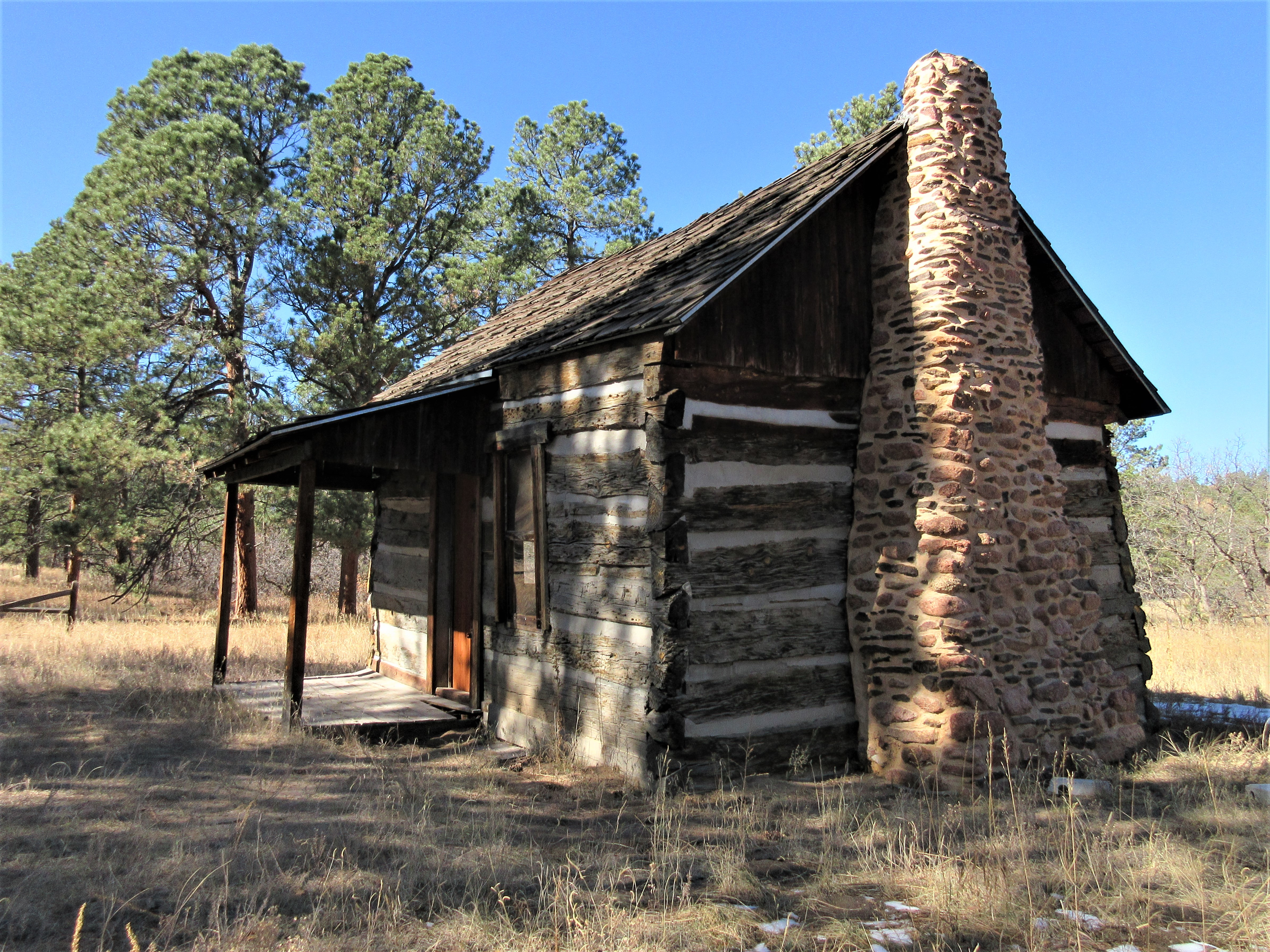

- Location within Colorado Location within the United States
- Location: U.S. Air Force Academy, Colorado Springs, Colorado
- Coordinates: 38°59′25″N 104°51′22″W
- Built: 1871-1877
- NRHP reference No.: 75000520
- CSRHP No.: 5EP.182

Significant dates
- Added to NRHP: January 27, 1975
- Designated CSRHP: January 27, 1975

Pioneer Cabin, also known as William A. Burgess House, is one of the oldest buildings in Colorado Springs, Colorado's Douglas Valley. It is on the National Register of Historic Places.

== History ==
The cabin was built between 1871 and 1877 by William Alexander Burgess.
