= Pauline Chapel (Colorado Springs, Colorado) =

Historic church in Colorado, United States

- U.S. National Register of Historic Places
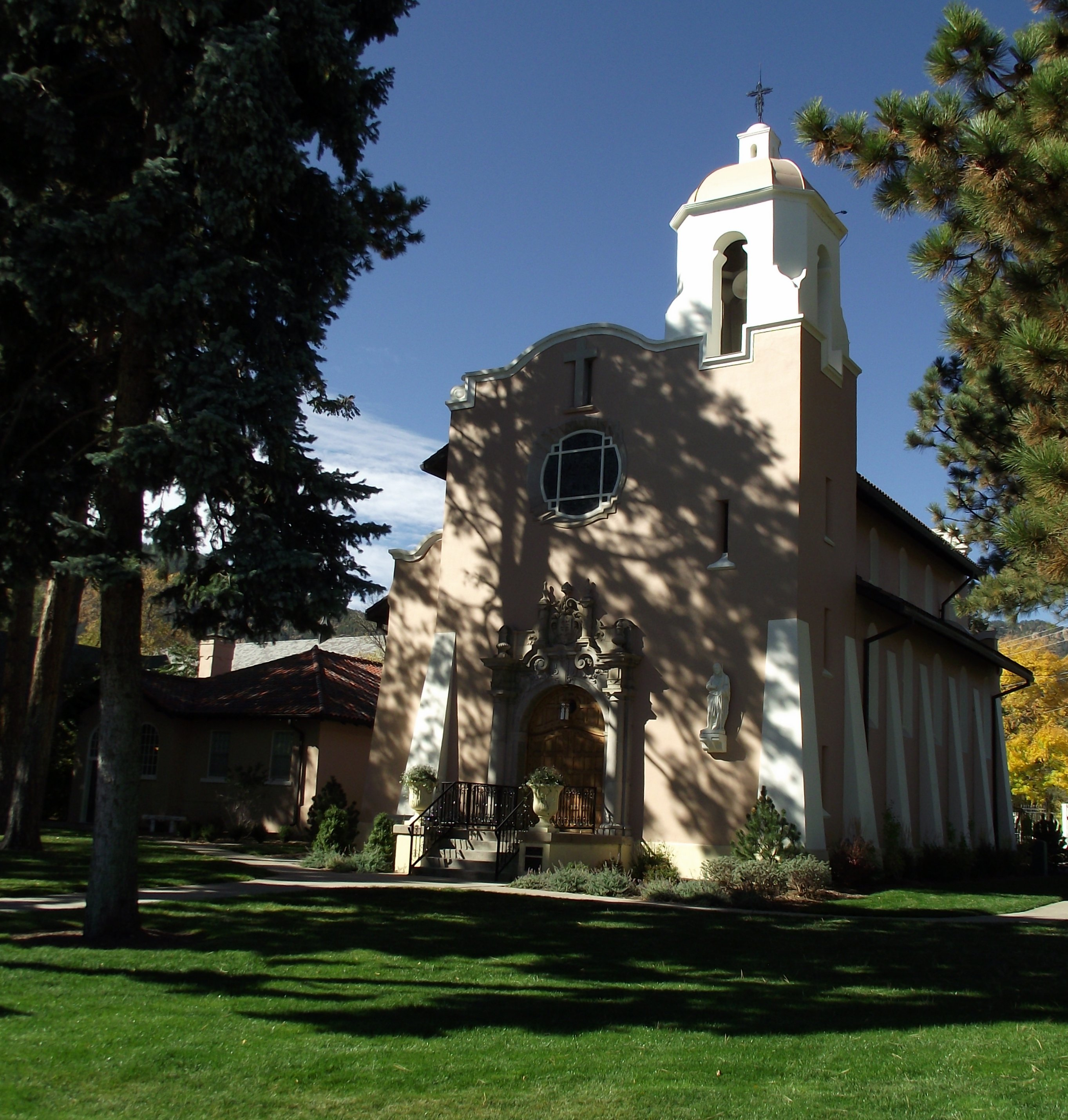

- Location within Colorado
- Location: 2 Park Ave.
- Coordinates: 38°47′31″N 104°51′14″W
- Built: 1919
- NRHP reference No.: 00001370
- Added to NRHP: February 26, 2001

The Pauline Chapel is a chapel on the National Register of Historic Places owned by The Broadmoor resort. It was built in 1919. The Chapel was not dedicated as a Catholic church until 1925. In 1918, Spencer Penrose submitted two designs for the chapel. The second was chosen.
