= Clarence R. Wallace =

United States Marine Corps general

Clarence Rodney Wallace
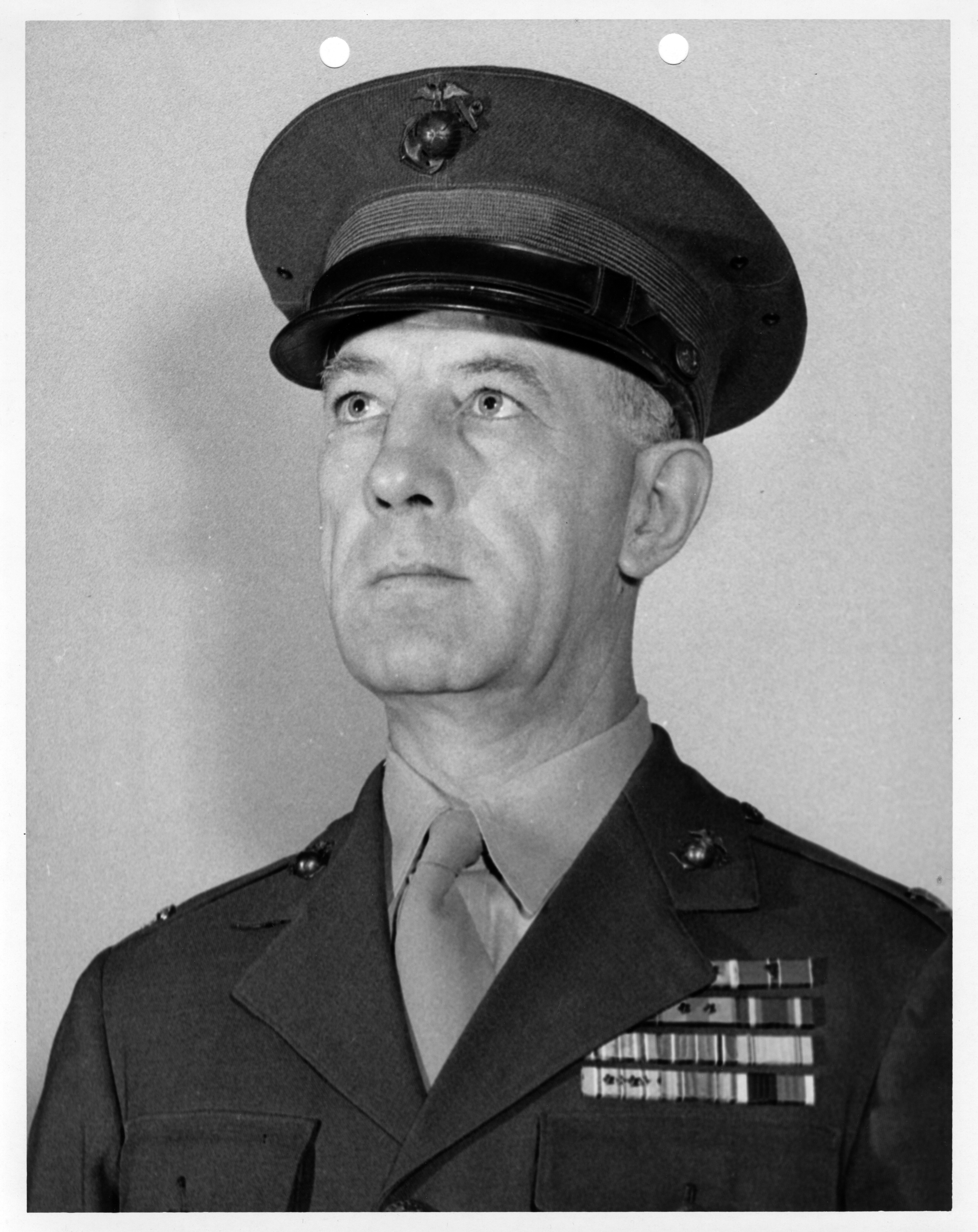
- Born: January 11, 1897; Manitou, Colorado, U.S.
- Died: August 1, 1988 (aged 91)
- Military career
- Allegiance: United States of America
- Branch: United States Marine Corps
- Service years: 1916–1949
- Rank: Brigadier general
- Service number: 0-1028
- Commands: 8th Marine Regiment
- Conflicts: Haitian Campaign; Yangtze Patrol; World War II: Battle of Kwajalein; Battle of Saipan; Battle of Tinian; Battle of Okinawa
- Awards: Legion of Merit (2); Bronze Star Medal

Clarence Rodney Wallace (January 11, 1897 – August 1, 1988) was a decorated officer of the United States Marine Corps with the rank of brigadier general. He is most noted for his service as commanding officer of the 8th Marine Regiment during World War II.

== Early career ==
Clarence R. Wallace was born on January 11, 1897, in Manitou Springs, Colorado, and later attended Manitou Springs High School (Manitou High School) there. He received appointment to the United States Naval Academy at Annapolis, Maryland, in June 1916 and following graduation with a Bachelor of Science degree in June 1919, he was commissioned second lieutenant in the Marine Corps at the same time.

In early July 1919, Wallace went to the Basic School at Marine Barracks Quantico, Virginia. He spent almost six months there and upon the completion of his course at the end of the year, was transferred to the Marine Corps Aviation. He was subsequently ordered to the Naval Air Station Pensacola, Florida one month later and entered Naval aviator training. However, he left the aviation service in January 1921 and was transferred to the Marine Barracks at Parris Island in South Carolina. While there, he was attached to the First Marine Brigade under Brigadier General John H. Russell Jr. and sailed for Haiti. He spent next two years with fighting the Cacos rebels until he was ordered back to the United States in July 1923.

His next service assignment was at Marine Corps Base San Diego, California, where he was posted to the 5th Marine Brigade under Joseph H. Pendleton. During this assignment, Wallace was stationed in San Diego and received promotion to the rank of first lieutenant in April 1925. He was subsequently transferred to the Marine Barracks Quantico, Virginia, in May 1926 and later attended the Company Officers course at Marine Corps School in March 1928.

Following the graduation, Wallace was attached to the 4th Marine Regiment and sailed for China in October 1928. He was stationed in Tianjin and later performed guard duties at the Shanghai International Settlement. He was ordered back to the United States during January 1929 and assigned to the Marine detachment aboard the Receiving Ship in San Francisco.

Wallace rejoined the Marine barracks at Quantico in August 1929 and subsequently was sent on a course at Army Signal School at Fort Monmouth, in New Jersey. He was then transferred to Washington, D.C., where he served at Headquarters Marine Corps until April 1931.

He then served his second expeditionary tour of duty in Haiti until September 1933, when he returned to Headquarters Marine Corps in Washington, D.C. This time he was assigned to the Office of the Quartermaster of the Marine Corps under Brigadier General Hugh L. Matthews and while in this capacity, he was promoted to the rank of captain in November 1934. He then spent brief period in the Office of the Chief of the Bureau of Engineering, Navy Department, under Rear Admiral Samuel M. Robinson, before he was appointed commander of the Marine detachment aboard the battleship USS West Virginia in May 1937.

== World War II ==
Wallace returned stateside in June 1939 and was assigned to the Senior Course at Marine Corps Schools Quantico. He finished the course in May 1940 and spent next year as major at the headquarters of Fleet Marine Force in San Diego. Wallace was subsequently transferred back to Quantico in June 1941 and attached as communications officer to the staff of Amphibious Forces, Atlantic Fleet under Rear Admiral Henry K. Hewitt.

He was promoted to the rank of lieutenant colonel in January 1942 and transferred back to Headquarters Marine Corps, but now to the Division of Plans and Policies. Within this assignment, Wallace made an observation tour to London in England. Following the creation of 4th Marine Division at Camp Pendleton, California, he was attached to the division staff for another observation duty during the Battle of Kwajalein in February 1944.

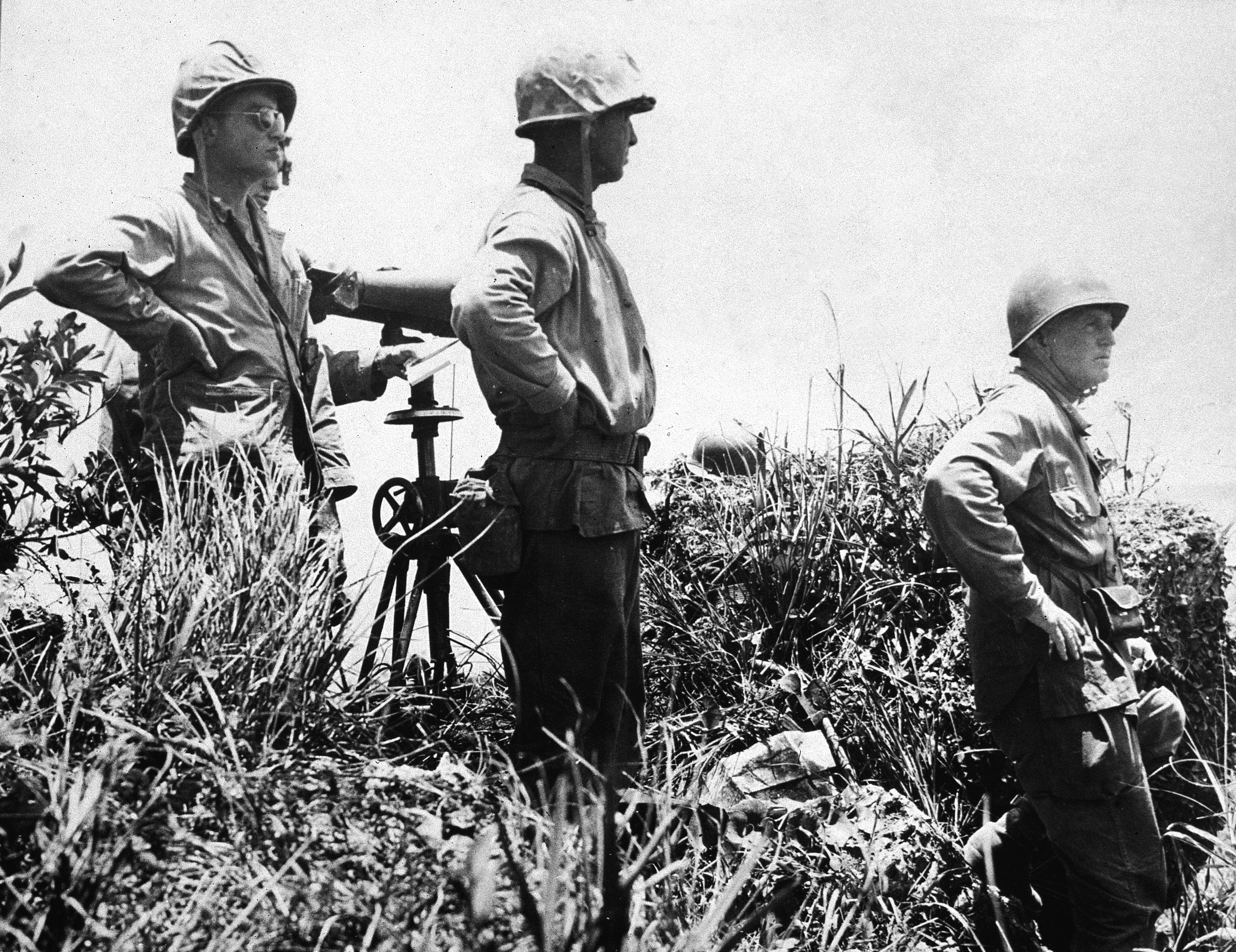
General Simon B. Buckner shortly before he was killed on Okinawa. Here at 8th Marines observation post with Colonel Clarence R. Wallace (center) and Major William Chamberlin (left).

Wallace was later promoted to the rank of colonel and appointed commanding officer of 8th Marine Regiment on April 10, 1944. The 8th Marines were located on Hawaii, to prepare for the upcoming Marianas Islands Campaign. Wallace led his regiment ashore during the Battle of Saipan in June 1944. It landed in the southwestern part of Saipan, not far from Chalan Kanoa village. The 8th Marines assaulted the beach fortifications and later helped seized the airstrip in Chalan Kanoa.

The 8th Marines under Wallace's command later attacked the Japanese positions along the Lake Susupe and advanced towards the highest point of Saipan, Mount Tapochau. Wallace's marines conquered the summit of Mt. Tapochau, an ideal observation post overlooking central Saipan. The 8th Marines subsequently repelled several small Japanese counter-attacks and advanced to Tanapag Harbor, where it was placed in the reserve on July 4, 1944.

After a brief rest and refit, Wallace and his 8th Marine Regiment landed on Tinian on the morning of July 25, 1944, and met only light Japanese fire on the beaches. Ushi Point, to the north of the island, was the main objective for this campaign. The 8th Marines captured the abandoned airfield on July 26. The advance of the 8th Marines was slowed down and finally halted by a typhoon, which occurred on July 28. Wallace was ordered to renew the advance on July 30 and subsequently received orders for a final attack on Japanese units fortified on the cliff in the north of the island. Tinian Island was declared secured on August 1, 1944.

The securing of Tinian helped to established a large bomber base from which U.S. planes could operate over the Philippine Sea and onto Japan. For his service on Saipan and Tinian, Wallace was decorated with the Legion of Merit with Combat "V".

Wallace subsequently returned with his regiment to Saipan to prepare for further deployment. However the 8th Marines were later designated as reserve troops for the III Marine Amphibious Corps for the Okinawa landings at the beginning of April 1945. The 8th Marines served only as a deception landing force and did not participate in the battle until the middle of June 1945, when the commanding general of Tenth Army, Simon B. Buckner, requested their deployment.

Wallace brought his regiment up to the front on June 18, 1945, in order to relieved the exhausted 7th Marine Regiment. The 8th Marine Regiment was tasked with cutting off the lines and reaching the coast. Lieutenant General Bucker had visited Wallace's forward command post to observe the progress of his regiment. While Wallace briefed the general about the situation, a Japanese artillery shell hit nearby coral rock and its fragments mortally wounded the general. Wallace and his executive officer, Major William C. Chamberlin, remained unharmed.

The 8th Marine Regiment later assaulted Ibaru Ridge and defeated all entrenched Japanese forces there. The regiment later conquered the town of Makabe on June 21, 1945, and the new Tenth Army Commander, Lieutenant General Roy S. Geiger, declared Okinawa secured during the following day. Wallace later led several mopping-up operations in order to destroy or capture remaining minor Japanese units.

For his part in this battle, Wallace received his second Legion of Merit with "V" Device and also received the Navy Presidential Unit Citation.

== Later career ==
At the beginning of July 1945, Wallace assumed duties as the chief of staff of the 5th Marine Division under Major General Thomas E. Bourke and took part in the occupation duties in Japan. Wallace was later decorated with the Bronze Star Medal with "V" Device for his services while in Japan.

Wallace returned to the United States in February 1946 and was assigned to the Headquarters Marine Corps in Washington, D.C., where he served on the Postwar Personnel Reorganization Board under Brigadier General Robert Blake. His responsibility was to study military records of all marine officers who wanted to stay in active service and make recommendations based on their records.

He was transferred to the Camp Lejeune in July 1946, where he was appointed chief of staff of the 2nd Marine Division under Major General Thomas E. Watson. The 2nd Marine Division just arrived from occupation duties in Japan and subsequently participated in training activities on the East Coast. He was transferred to Chicago in June 1948 and appointed officer in charge of the Central Recruiting Division.

Wallace finally retired from active service on June 30, 1949, after 33 years of service in the Marine Corps. He was advanced to the rank of brigadier general for having been specially commended in combat.

== Decorations ==
Here is the ribbon bar of Brigadier General Clarence R. Wallace:

1st Row	Legion of Merit with one 5/16" gold star and Combat "V"	Bronze Star Medal with Combat "V"	Navy Presidential Unit Citation	Marine Corps Expeditionary Medal with two stars
2nd Row	World War I Victory Medal	Yangtze Service Medal	American Defense Service Medal	American Campaign Medal
3rd Row	European–African–Middle Eastern Campaign Medal	Asiatic-Pacific Campaign Medal with four 3/16 inch service stars	World War II Victory Medal	Navy Occupation Service Medal

== See also ==
- Battle of Okinawa

Military offices
Preceded by John H. Griebel	Commanding Officer, 8th Marine Regiment; April 10, 1944 – June 28, 1945	Succeeded by James F. Shaw
