= Eastholme =

- U.S. National Register of Historic Places
- Colorado State Register of Historic Properties No. 5EP.415
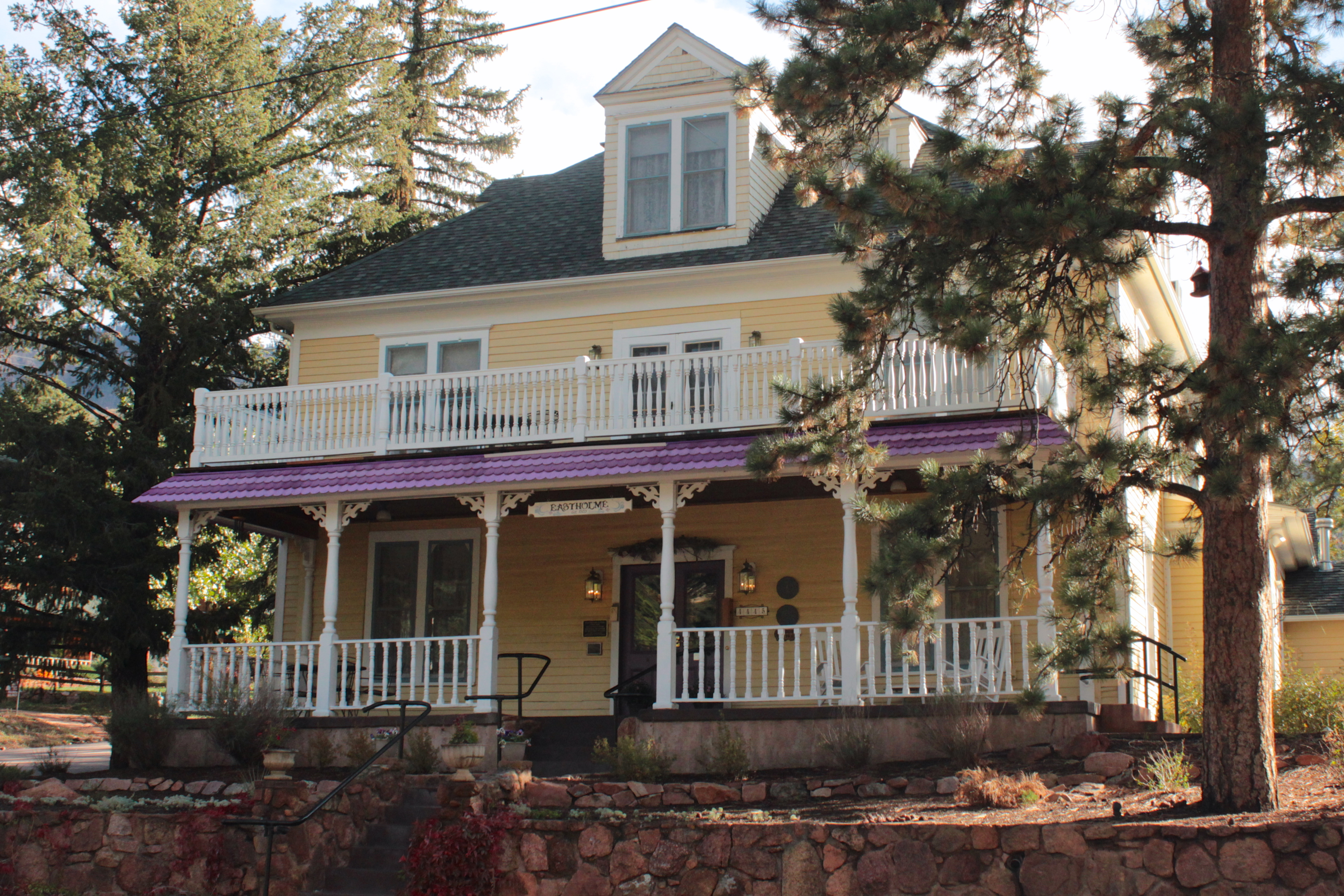

- Location within Colorado Location within the United States
- Location: 4445 Haggerman Avenue, Cascade, near Colorado Springs, Colorado
- Coordinates: 38°53′51″N 104°58′8″W
- Built: 1886-1887
- NRHP reference No.: 98001250
- CSRHP No.: 5EP.415

Significant dates
- Added to NRHP: October 22, 1998
- Designated CSRHP: October 22, 1998

The Eastholme, also known as Eastholme of the Rockies, is a historic building in Cascade, near Colorado Springs, Colorado. It is on the National Register of Historic Places.

== History ==
The building was built in 1886 (Note: It is also said to have been built in 1885.) and in operation by 1887 as a boarding house.

It was built by a widow, Eliza Marriott Hewlett, and her sisters, Ellen and Caroline. Hewlett was from Schenectady, New York. Eliza Marriott Hewlett, the oldest of three sisters, left the state of New York for Colorado in the 1880s, and brought her two children with her to Cascade. It was quite uncommon for "ladies of leisure" to have moved to Colorado during this period; It was theorized that the women "may have come because of the publicity lent to the area by such romantic writers of the day as Helen Hunt..., who extolled the beauties of the Pikes Peak region."

Most of Cascade Canyon was homesteaded by the sisters. Caroline Marriott lived near the confluence of French and Fountain Creeks. Ellen lived beside waterfalls, "high up in the canyon" and Eliza lived at the entrance to Cascade Canyon in a log cabin. There she "entertained friends from Manitou at taffy pulls and sledding parties. Others came to the area for their health or to establish ranches. Uncommon for a woman the 1880s, Hewlett became the Cascade Town and Improvement Company's secretary. The company contributed to the cost of the development of the Pikes Peak Carriage Road and, having purchased land from the sisters in 1886 opened two larger hotels in Cascade.

The building, designed after elegant eastern hotels, had eight gables. When the railway was established through Ute Pass, there was an increase in tourism in the area and development of large resort hotels. Eastholme is the only remaining summer resort building in Cascade. The inn is a designated Ute Pass Landmark by the 1976 Bicentennial Committee.

In 1888, Eastholme was sold by Hewlett to her sister. Hewlett was, however, listed as proprietor of the hotel in 1892 and 1897 business directories. For a short period of time Eastholme was used as a sanitarium and leased as a boarding house. William Slutz bought the property in 1899. It was purchased in 1913 by Mr. and Mrs. A.S. Hewitt.

Following the closure of the Colorado Midland Railway, large hotels "would disappear in the 1920s." Over time, though, Eastholme was able to survive and continues to operate as a source of lodging.

During the 1920s many tourists began to travel by car, rather than train. Eastholme accommodated the travelers, as well as racers in the Pikes Peak International Hill Climb.

It was operated by Mrs. Hewitt, after the death of her husband in 1919, until 1940 when it was sold to Mrs. Stanley Eastham. Between 1913 and 1940, the Hewitts added an extension to the house, constructed cottages and named the building the "East Home Hotel". The Jacobsons purchased the building in 1970 and operated as a boarding house throughout the year. In 1988, they converted it to a bed and breakfast. It was sold to Teresha Thompson in 1995.

== Ute Pass summer resorts ==
The Colorado Midland Railway provided service from Old Colorado City, then Colorado City, west through Ute Pass. Communities were developed for people seeking summer respite. In the 1880s, there were also people in the Cascade Canyon area that ran businesses delivering supplies via mule trains to the Leadville and Cripple Creek mining towns.

The Cascade Canyon House was opened by the Cascade Town Company in 1887 and The Ramona House, "the town's centerpiece", was opened in 1891. Thousands of tourists traveled along the Pikes Peak Carriage Road up to Pikes Peak's summit. It was opened by the Cascade Town Company in 1888 and closed in 1902.

Ute Park, now Chipita, Green Mountain Falls, and Crystola were also developed in this time period.

== Bed and breakfast inn ==
The bed and breakfast inn, now called Eastholme of the Rockies, opened in 1988 as a guest inn. It has 2 cottages, 2 suites and 4 guest rooms. Fireplaces are in each room, and bathrooms are in each cottage or room, except the 2 guest rooms on the third floor. Shared space includes a large porch spans the width of the front of the building, spacious dining room and parlor, and a backyard brick patio. The inn's gazebo may be used for events, such as weddings. It is furnished with turn-of-the-century antiques and a piano in the inn since the late 19th-century. It is a member of the Bed and Breakfast Innkeepers of Colorado.

Some of the inn's recipes are published in the Tasting Colorado: Favorite Recipes from the Centennial State book by Michele Morris. It was featured in the January, 2003 issue of Country Magazine.

== Ghost ==
The ghost of a young woman in a tea-length, red satin dress is said to have been seen in the inn. The inn is also said to have experienced supernatural events when no one is visible, such as notes being played on the piano, electrical equipment being manipulated, the name "Grace" being whispered, and the sound of footsteps.

== Notable guests ==
Before they were married, Dwight and Mamie Eisenhower stayed at the inn, as did her parents, the Douds, from Denver. The Douds stayed at Eastholme on many occasions. Racers in the Pikes Peak International Hill Climb stayed at inn in the 1920s. They "soaked the wooden wheels in barrels in the yard."

== See also ==
- History of Colorado Springs, Colorado
