= Manitou Springs School District 14 =

School district in Colorado, United States

Address
- 405 El Monte Place Manitou Springs, Colorado, 80829; United States
- Coordinates: 38°51′21″N 104°54′13″W

District information
- Motto: Compassionate citizens contributing with knowledge and integrity to a dynamic world.
- Superintendent: Sean Dorsey
- Enrollment: 1304 (October 2003)

Other information
- Website: www.mssd14.org

Manitou Springs School District 14 is the main school district of Manitou Springs and its nearby communities (Cascade, Cedar Heights, Chipita Park, and Green Mountain Falls) at the western edge of El Paso County, Colorado.

The district currently serves around 1400 students, about 30 percent of these being "choice" students who live outside of the district's immediate boundaries (usually coming from elsewhere in El Paso or Teller counties).

It has the highest graduation rate in the Pikes Peak Region. The district has a 1-to-1 iPad Initiative for every student in grades five through twelve.

== List of schools ==
- Manitou Springs Elementary School
- Ute Pass Elementary School (located in Chipita Park)
- Manitou Springs Middle School
- Manitou Springs High School

== See also ==
- List of school districts in Colorado
