= Cascade-Chipita Park, Colorado =

Census-designated place in El Paso County, Colorado, United States

Cascade-Chipita Park CDP, Colorado
- Census-designated place
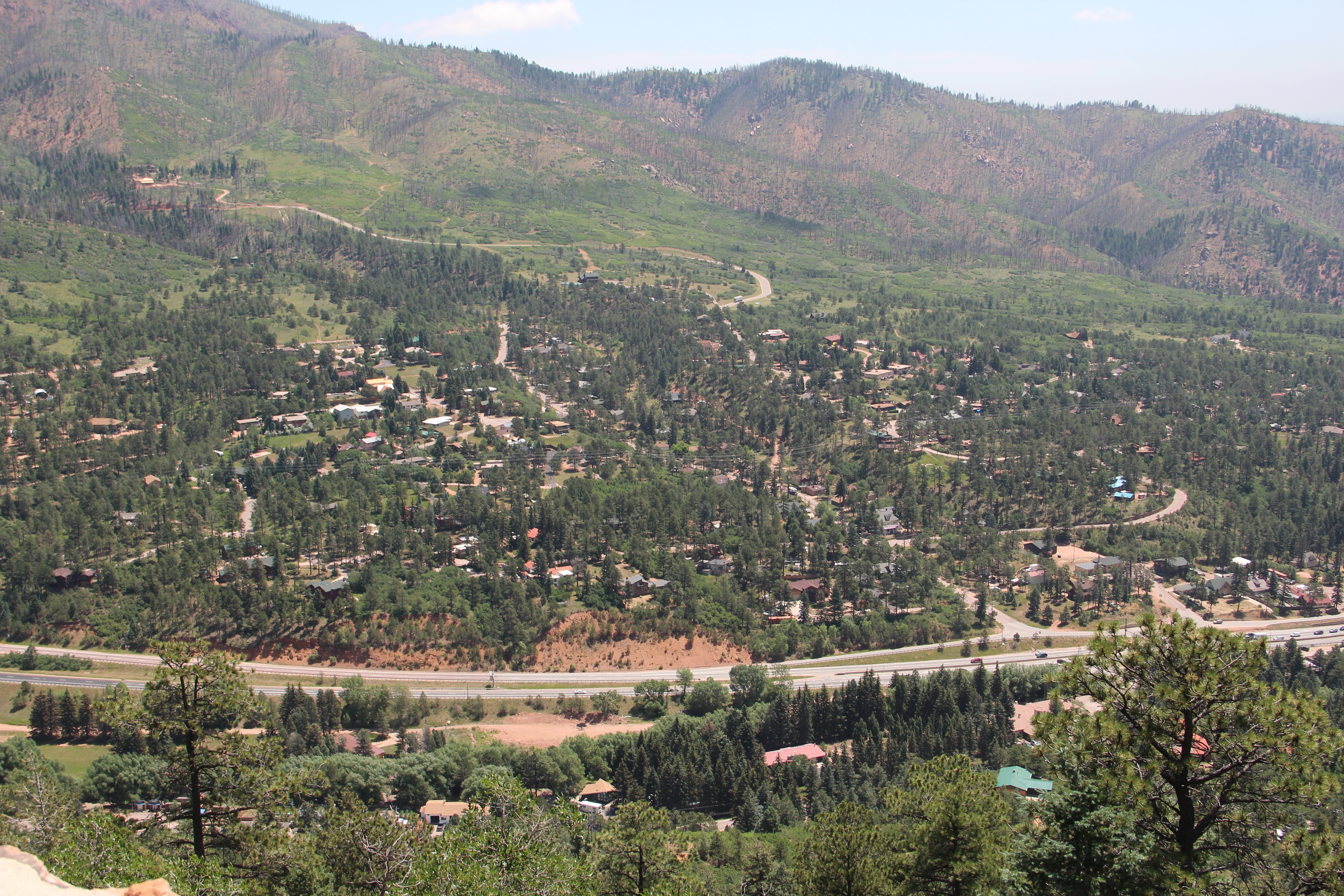
- Cascade, Colorado

- Location of the Cascade-Chipita Park CDP in El Paso County, Colorado
- Coordinates: 30°00′15″N 105°00′08″W
- Country: United States
- State: Colorado
- County: El Paso

Government
  - Type: Unincorporated community
  - Body: El Paso County

Area
  - Total: 13.461 sq mi (34.864 km^{2})
  - Land: 13.452 sq mi (34.841 km^{2})
  - Water: 0.0089 sq mi (0.023 km^{2})
- Elevation: 7,379 ft (2,249 m)

Population (2020)
  - Total: 1,628
  - Density: 121.0/sq mi (46.73/km^{2})
- Time zone: UTC−07:00 (MST)
  - Summer (DST): UTC−06:00 (MDT)
- ZIP code: Cascade 80809
- Area code: 719
- GNIS CDP ID: 2407982
- FIPS code: FIPS 0812325

Cascade-Chipita Park is a census-designated place (CDP) comprising the unincorporated communities of Cascade and Chipita Park located in, and governed by, El Paso County, Colorado, United States. The population of the Cascade-Chipita Park CDP was 1,628 at the United States Census 2020. The CDP is a part of the Colorado Springs, CO Metropolitan Statistical Area and the Front Range Urban Corridor. The Cascade, Colorado, post office (Zip Code 80809) serves the area.

== History ==
The Cascade, Colorado, post office opened on August 16, 1887. The Chipita Park, Colorado, post office operated from March 9, 1935, until May 31, 1967, when it was merged into the Cascade post office

== Geography ==
Cascade, Colorado, is located in western El Paso County. Chipita Park, Colorado, is located 2.7 miles (4.3 km) northwest of Cascade at an elevation 7,796 feet (2,376 m).

At the 2020 United States Census, the Cascade-Chipita Park CDP had an area of 8,615 acres (34.864 km^{2}), including 5.7 acres (0.023 km^{2}) of water.

== Demographics ==
The United States Census Bureau initially defined the Cascade-Chipita Park for the 1990 United States census.

Cascade-Chipita Park CDP, Colorado
Year	Pop.	±%
1990	1,479	—
2000	1,709	+15.6%
2010	1,655	−3.2%
2020	1,628	−1.6%
Source: United States Census Bureau

=== 2020 census ===
As of the 2020 census, Cascade-Chipita Park had a population of 1,628. The median age was 52.9 years. 16.0% of residents were under the age of 18 and 27.4% of residents were 65 years of age or older. For every 100 females there were 98.3 males, and for every 100 females age 18 and over there were 96.6 males age 18 and over.

65.1% of residents lived in urban areas, while 34.9% lived in rural areas.

There were 725 households in Cascade-Chipita Park, of which 17.2% had children under the age of 18 living in them. Of all households, 56.0% were married-couple households, 16.6% were households with a male householder and no spouse or partner present, and 21.2% were households with a female householder and no spouse or partner present. About 28.0% of all households were made up of individuals and 14.7% had someone living alone who was 65 years of age or older.

There were 906 housing units, of which 20.0% were vacant. The homeowner vacancy rate was 1.6% and the rental vacancy rate was 12.0%.

Racial composition as of the 2020 census
Race	Number	Percent
White	1,458	89.6%
Black or African American	10	0.6%
American Indian and Alaska Native	7	0.4%
Asian	12	0.7%
Native Hawaiian and Other Pacific Islander	1	0.1%
Some other race	22	1.4%
Two or more races	118	7.2%
Hispanic or Latino (of any race)	92	5.7%

== Education ==
Almost all of the CDP is in the Manitou Springs School District 14. A piece extends into the Lewis-Palmer School District 38.

== See also ==
- Front Range Urban Corridor
- List of census-designated places in Colorado
