= Briarhurst =

Historic house in Colorado, United States

- Briarhurst Manor
- U.S. National Register of Historic Places
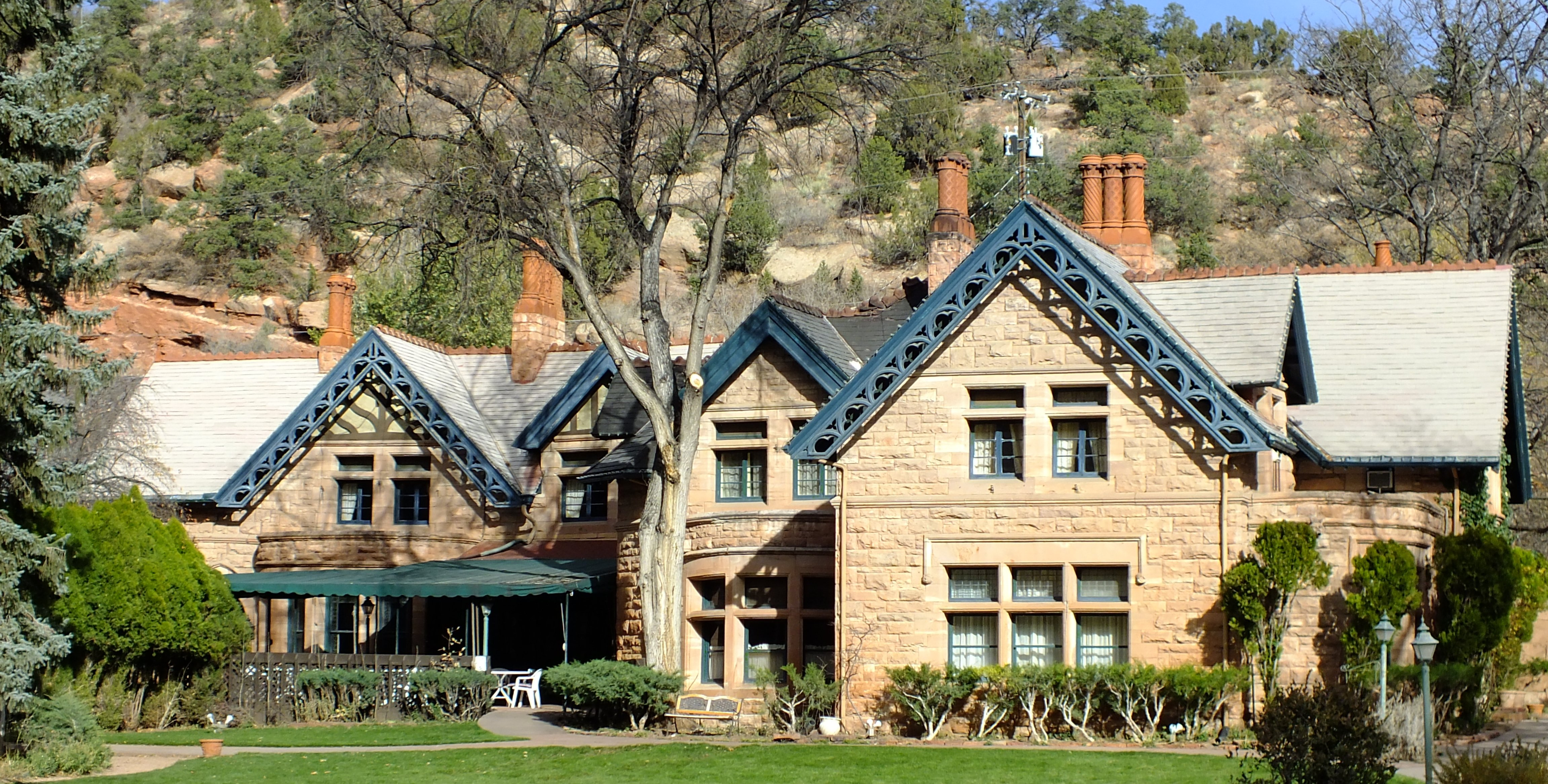
- Briarhurst Manor, Front View

- Location within Colorado Location within the United States
- Location: 404 Manitou Ave., Manitou Springs, Colorado
- Coordinates: 38°51′14″N 104°54′12″W
- Built: 1888
- Architect: Varian & Sterner; Frederick Sterner
- Architectural style: Gothic
- NRHP reference No.: 73000473
- Added to NRHP: April 23, 1973

Briarhurst Manor, also known as William A. Bell House, is a finely grained pink Victorian sandstone manor house listed on the National Register of Historic Places in the city of Manitou Springs, Colorado. It is the second building on this site.

Construction of the original Briarhurst began in 1872. Dr. William Bell, the home's owner, left for England to marry a woman named Cara, who agreed to live with Bell in Colorado as long as her children were born in England. The Tudor Revival style home was added to the National Register of Historic Places in 1973. Fountain Creek passes through the estate and the home is in the shadow of Pikes Peak.

Under Mrs. Cara Bell's direction, Briarhurst became "the social center" of the community, hosting the internationally famous of the day, President Grant, President Teddy Roosevelt and Oscar Wilde after his lecture in Colorado Springs in 1882. On occasion, a tribe of friendly Utes camped on the Briarhurst estate grounds while preparing to go into the Garden of the Gods, for them a holy place of worship.

One winter night in 1886, while Dr. Bell was away on business, Mrs. Bell awoke to a bedroom filled with smoke. Burning embers escaped from a fireplace in Briarhurst. She woke the children and servants. Cara stayed in the burning house and with the help of gardener Schneider, they rescued a prized oil painting by Thomas Moran, the "Mount of the Holy Cross". The family escaped safely, but lost all of their belongings and returned to England. They returned in early 1887 to begin reconstruction of a second, more elaborate Briarhurst Manor, complete with schoolroom, conservatory, cloister and a library with a special alcove to display the "Mount of the Holy Cross."

Today, 5 acres (20,000 m^{2}) of the original Briarhurst estate is an event venue operated where hundreds of weddings and receptions are celebrated.

== See also ==
- National Register of Historic Places listings in El Paso County, Colorado
