= Manitou Cliff Dwellings =

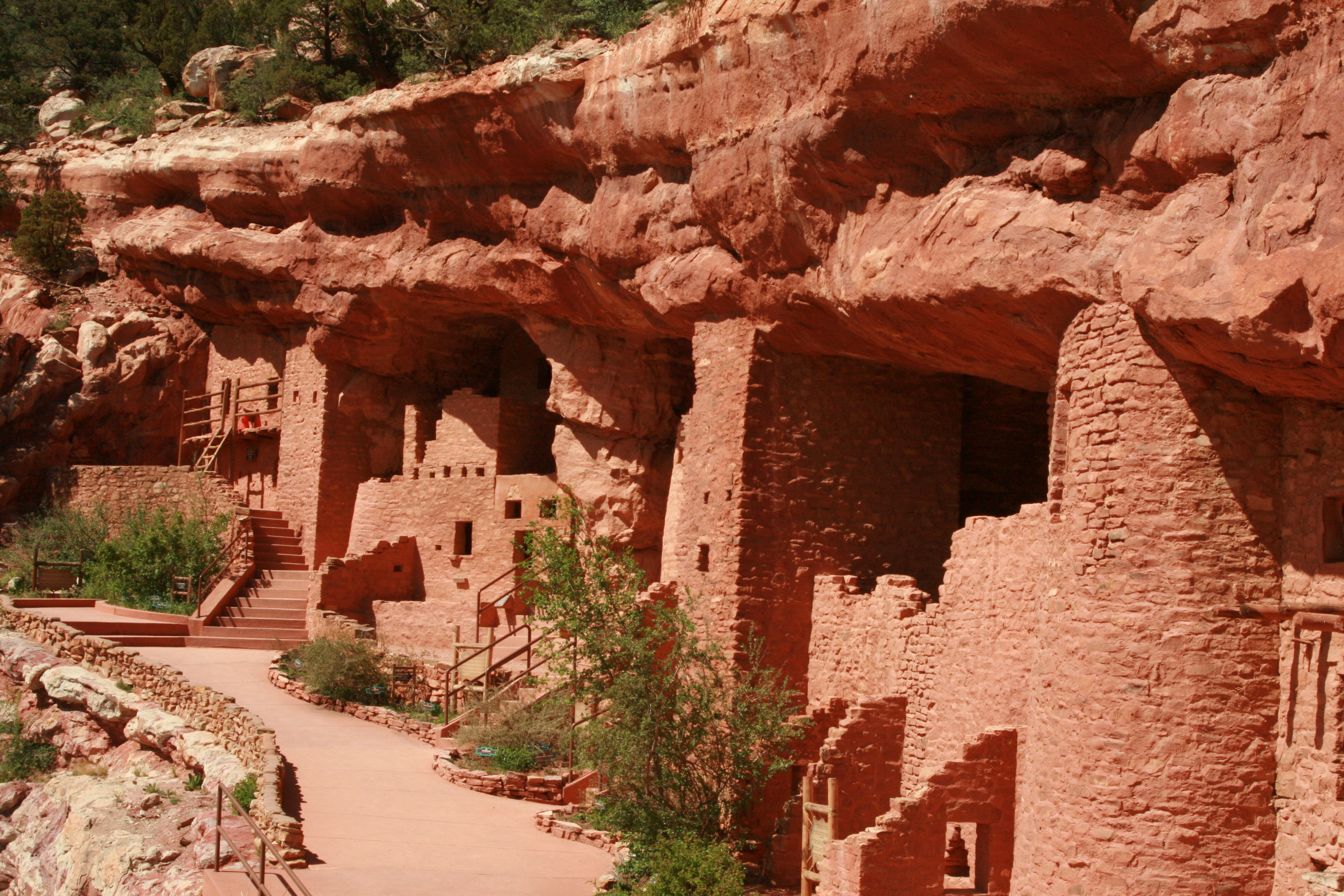
- Established: 1907
- Location: 10 Cliff Road; Manitou Springs, Colorado
- Coordinates: 38.8634°N 104.9124°W
- Type: Archaeological museum
- Website: www.cliffdwellingsmuseum.com

The Manitou Cliff Dwellings are a privately owned tourist attraction consisting of replica Ancestral Puebloan cliff dwellings and interpretive exhibits located just west of Colorado Springs, Colorado, on U.S. Highway 24 in Manitou Springs.

The attraction was built using stonework taken from a prehistoric Pueblo site in 1904 and was opened to the public in 1907. An associated private museum features commercially developed displays about Ancestral Puebloan peoples including exhibits of archaeological artifacts, tools, pottery, and weapons from Indigenous sites and/or replicated by the company that operates the site. Included in the museum is an interactive hands-on demonstration of a traditional horno oven, used for cooking. The buildings were created as part of a commercial venture to divert tourists from Southwest archaeological sites by creating a version of a Pueblo dwelling place that was more easily accessible to early 20th century American visitors. Visitors can walk through the dwellings, and various displays and interpretive material attempt to imbue the entire attraction with a sense of authenticity, though the Manitou Cliff Dwellings are not themselves authentic.

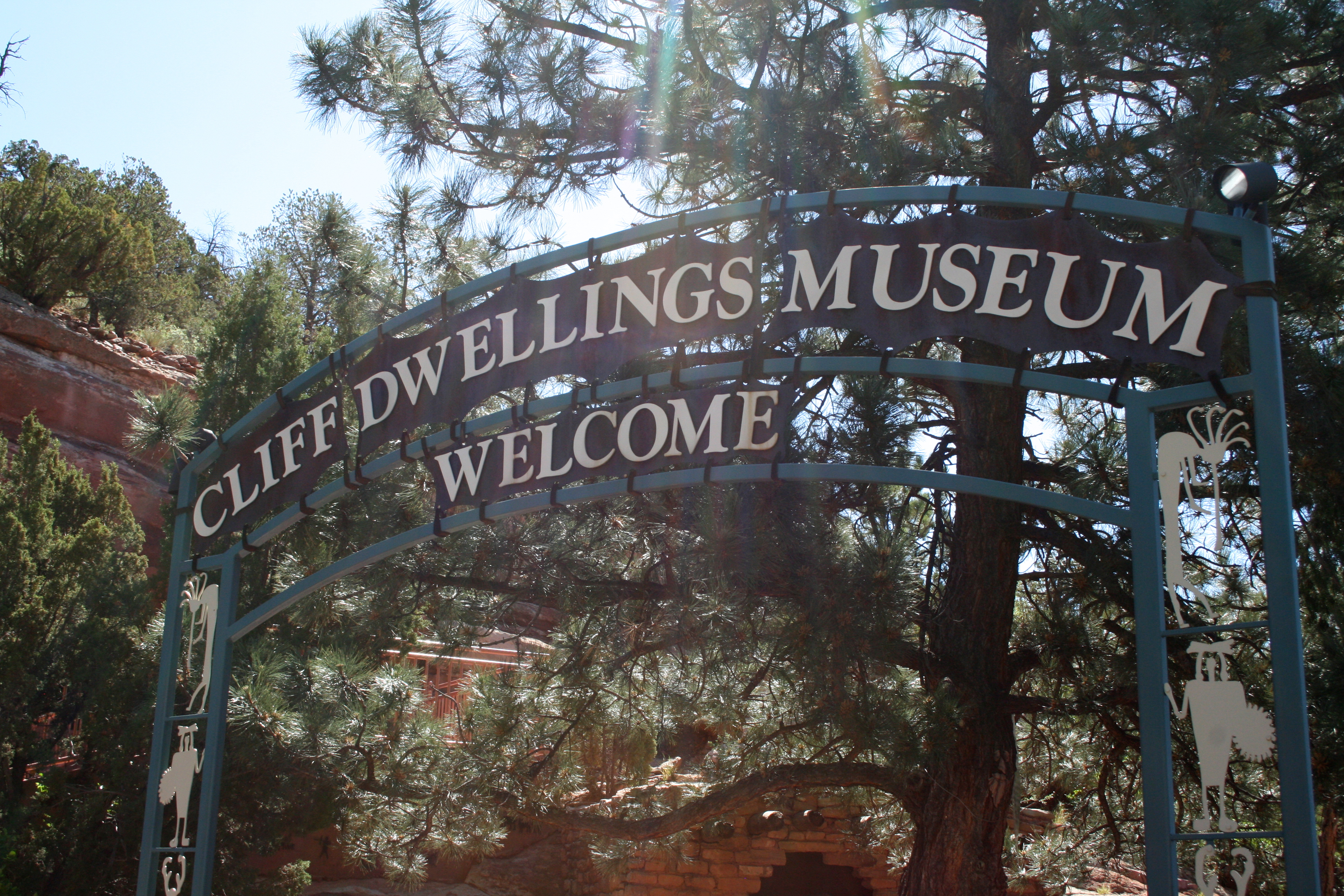
Manitou Cliff Dwellings Museum Sign

== History ==
The Ancestral Puebloans lived and travelled the Four Corners area of the Southwestern United States from 1200 B.C. to A.D. 1300. Ancestral Puebloan peoples did not permanently live in the Manitou Springs area, but lived and built their cliff dwellings in the Four Corners area and across the Northern Rio Grande, several hundred miles southwest of Manitou Springs. The Manitou Cliff Dwellings were built at their present location in the early 1900s, as a museum and tourist attraction. Some of the building materials were looted and stolen from a collapsed Ancestral Puebloan site near Cortez in southwest Colorado, shipped by railroad to Manitou Springs, and assembled in their present form as Ancestral Puebloan-style buildings resembling those found in the Four Corners.

The project was directed primarily by Harold Ashenhurst and Virginia McClurg, founder of the Colorado Cliff Dwelling Association. Virginia McClurg focused her life on advocacy for women and fighting for human welfare and stability, especially within Indigenous cultures. This is why she was inspired to take on this project of preserving historical Indigenous historical art. After failed labors of trying to come up with an agreement for the future of Mesa Verde Park and how it would have been organized as well as trying to get Congress to pass the Antiquities Act, McClurg established the Colorado Cliff Dwellings Association, which led to the beginning of the dwellings endeavor.

The ownership of the Cliff Dwellings has stayed within the family of Peyton Priddy for generations, according to General Manager Michele Hefner. Priddy was so enamored by the Dwellings as a child that years later, he brought it upon himself, alongside his wife, to purchase this attraction after its closure due to World War II, which he was able to do after selling his family movie theater business.

The United States has tourist attractions called architectural collections or reconstructed villages, the Manitou Cliff Dwellings are an example of these. Reconstructed villages promote history and are constructed for people to experience the history and heritage for themselves, while also promoting tourism and entertainment.

== Controversy ==
McClurg's creation of Manitou was highly controversial even at the time of its opening, in part because it was being promoted as authentic, and since they were built as a form of entertainment to promote tourism. Additionally it could be seen as controversial since it eventually caused the demise of the Colorado Cliff Dwelling Association and created rifts amongst Southwest archaeologists and enthusiasts. Edgar Lee Hewett, a famous early Southwest anthropologist, is widely cited at Manitou and in the attraction's materials as having approved of its construction, but in reality, Hewett was reluctant to legitimize the site and had little regard for the reconstructions. The McClurg family continues to operate the attraction to this day. Although this site and museum give tourists a feel for what the cliff dwellings were like, it is not an authentic representation of the dwelling as Manitou Springs is far outside the boundaries of the Ancestral Puebloan settlement region.

The authenticity of this site had been debated by archeologist Richard Wilshusen, who argued that since the site was created with supplies not available to Ancestral Puebloans the creators cannot claim this to be an accurate representation.

Raven Payment and Monica Snowbird, visitors to the Manitou Cliff Dwellings Museum who are a part of the Pikes Peak Indigenous Women's Alliance, were left with many negative emotions after visiting the site because they believed it did nothing but add towards the already negative common stereotypes of Indigenous people, calling out offensive terms used within the museum tour.

== See also ==
- Cave of the Winds (Colorado)
- Garden of the Gods
- Seven Falls
