= Maritime Heritage Trail – Battle of Saipan =

Group of WWII wrecks in the lagoon at Saipan in the Northern Mariana Islands

Maritime Heritage Trail: Battle of Saipan
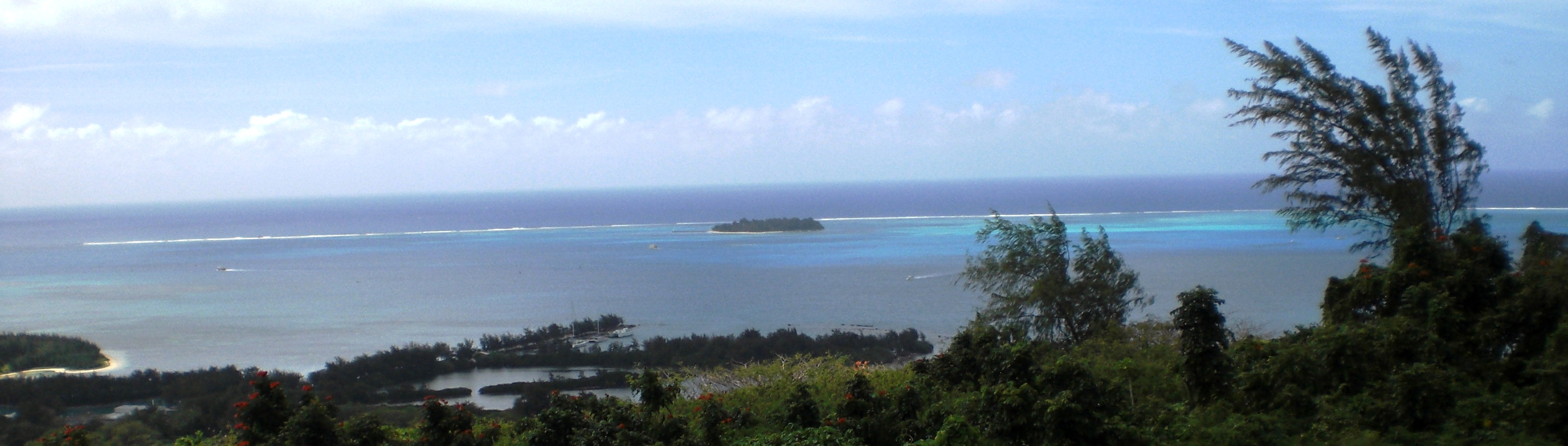
- View from Above, Tanapag Harbor and Mañagaha Island

Underwater Heritage Trail
- Location: Saipan, Northern Mariana Islands, United States
- Average Depth: 14 m (46 ft) max. depth (Tanapag Lagoon) with an average < 3 m (9.8 ft) through to Garapan Lagoon. Chalan Kanoa Lagoon is very shallow with depths constantly changing with the tide
- Recreational Use: SCUBA diving, Snorkeling, Swimming, Kayaking
- Difficulty Level: Suitable for all levels and ages
- Season: Accessible Year Round
- 7 days a week

Types of Sites
- Classification: Fully and partially submerged World War II Military Craft
- The Sites: Auxiliary Ships (2), Sherman Tanks (3), LVT (1), Daihatsu Landing Craft (2), Air and Sea-planes (4)
- Environment: Salt Water Lagoon

The Maritime Heritage Trail – Battle of Saipan is located within the protected waters of Saipan lagoon in the Northern Marianas archipelago. The majority of the dive sites including two Japanese shipwrecks, two Japanese aircraft, two US aircraft, a US landing vehicle and two Japanese landing craft can be found in the clear waters between Garapan, Tanapag Harbor, and Mañagaha Island while further south in Chalan Kanoa Lagoon there are three US tanks.

== Maritime Heritage Trail ==
Each of the dive sites along the trail are associated with the Battle of Saipan and include wrecked or discarded vehicles which were in use during World War II, representing one of the most pivotal battles fought in the Pacific Theatre. Each of the stops along the trail are unique because they showcase a number of different underwater sites including airplanes, landing craft, tanks, and ships. These sites are significant to both the Japanese and US nations but also to Korean, Chamorro, Carolinian and Filipino peoples who were involved in the conflict. These underwater sites represent wartime activities that added to Saipan's rich maritime cultural heritage.

=== Tanapag Lagoon ===
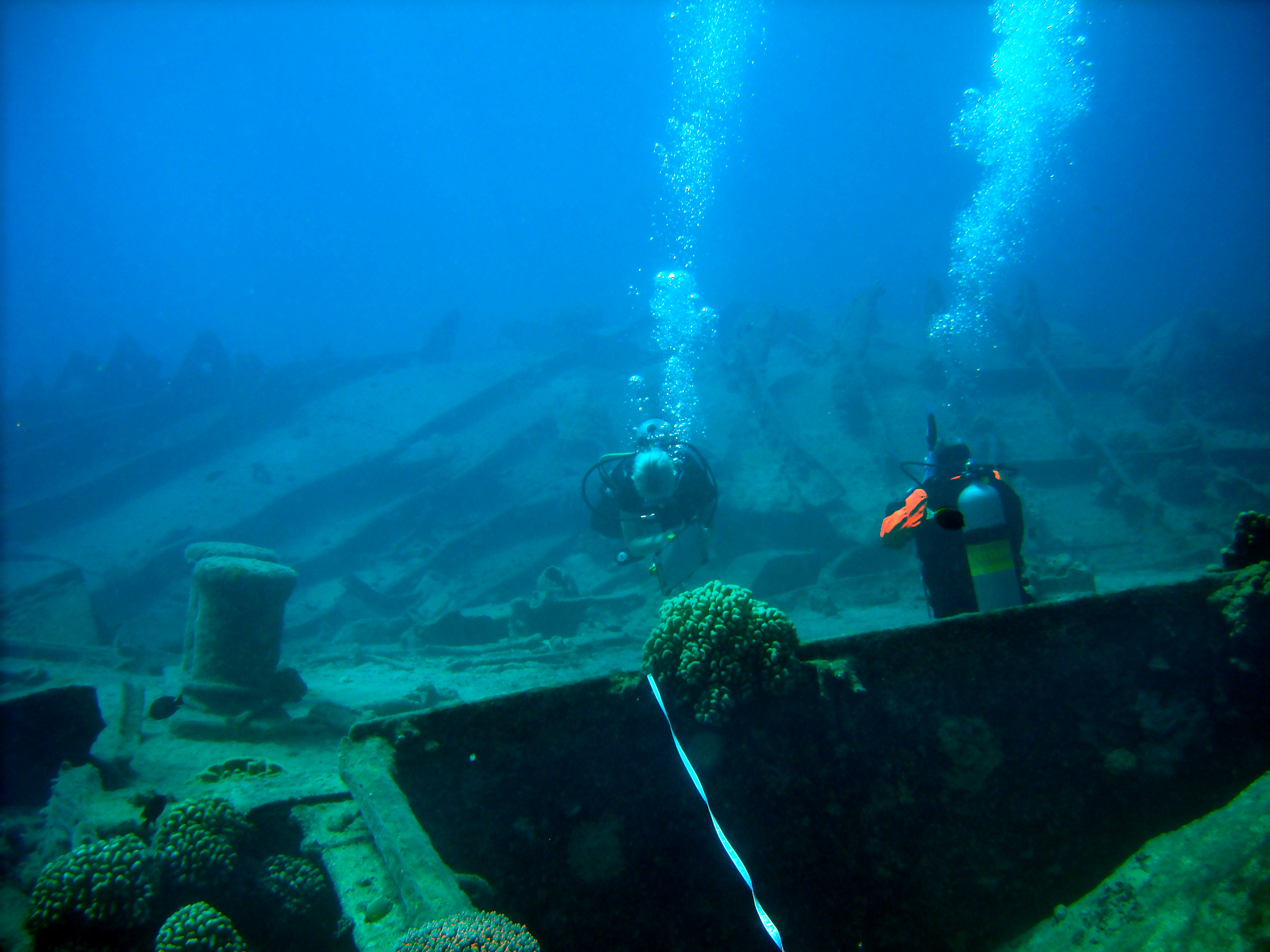
Japanese Merchant Vessel

Tanapag Lagoon (Puetton Tanapag in Chamorro) has been Saipan's primary harbor from prehistoric times through to the present day. Due to its deep waters and natural barriers against the forces of the ocean, the lagoon has been an important maritime resource since prehistoric times. Mañagaha and the surrounding barrier reef form a natural breakwater making these waters an ideal haven for watercraft of all shapes and sizes. It was significant to the invasion of World War II. The Japanese Imperial Navy had a base here and launched decisive attacks against the Allied forces from this strategic position. After seizing the island, the United States Navy took possession of the lagoon and expanded its harbor facilities substantially. Today it is home to 9 of the 12 sites that were chosen to be part of the maritime heritage trail.

=== The Sites ===
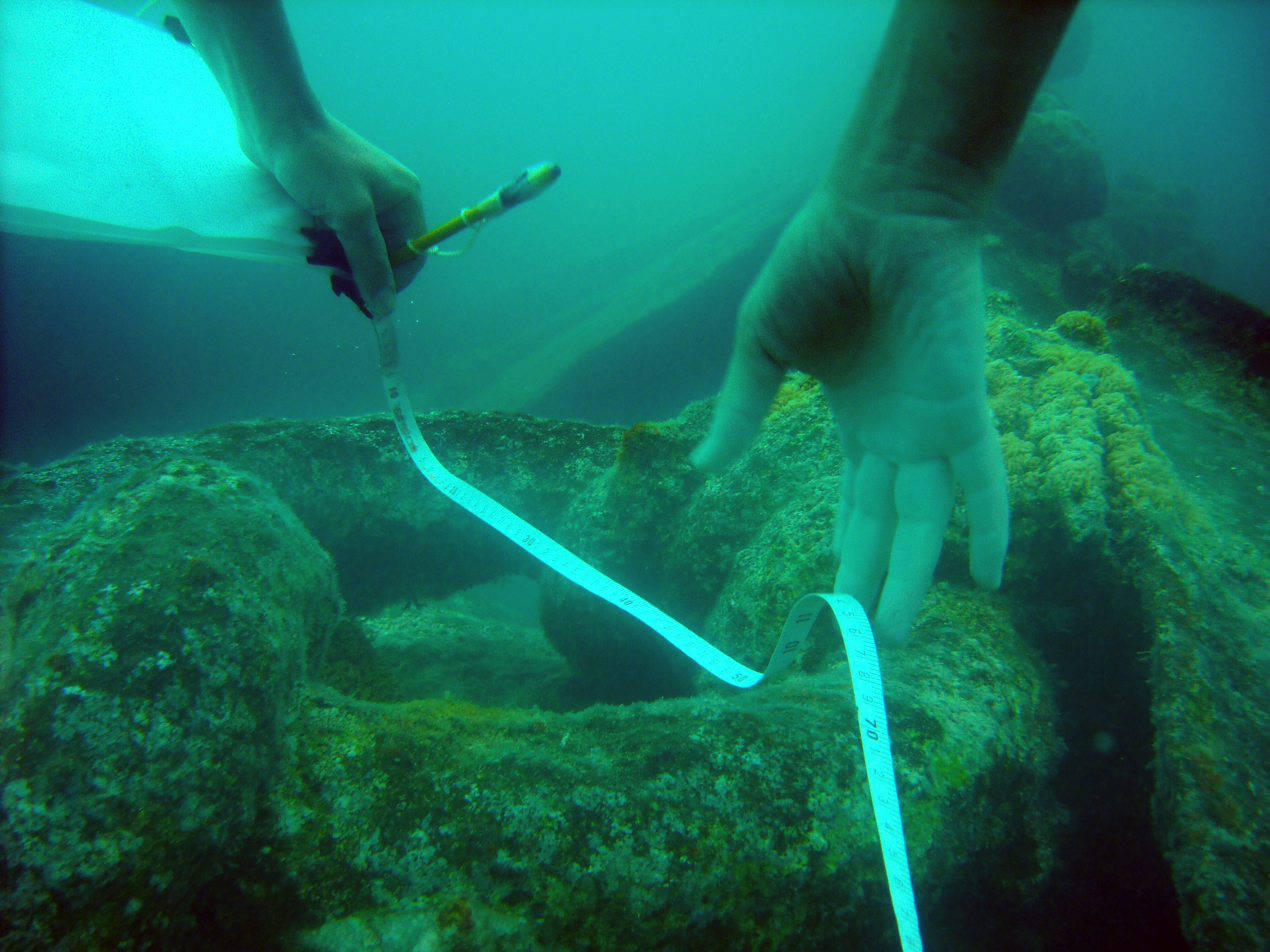
Recording the Past

The dive sites on the trail give the events surrounding the Battle of Saipan a new life and can be seen as an extension to the various World War II sites on land. They allow visitors to see the battle from a different perspective.

==== Aircraft ====
The airplane is an invention from recent history. Born during the industrial age they have been heavily mass-produced. During World War II naval aircraft were mass-produced in the thousands by both the US and the Japanese forces. The archaeological significance of surviving underwater military aircraft is growing fast. The aircraft of World War II are popular attractions on land and underwater and unfortunately are often the subject of collectors looking for a souvenir.

The WWII Maritime Heritage Trail includes four submerged aircraft. Providing examples of various war planes, they include a Japanese Kawanishi H8K (Allied named "Emily"), a Japanese Aichi E13A (Allied named "Jake"), a US Martin PBM Mariner, and a US TBM Avenger.

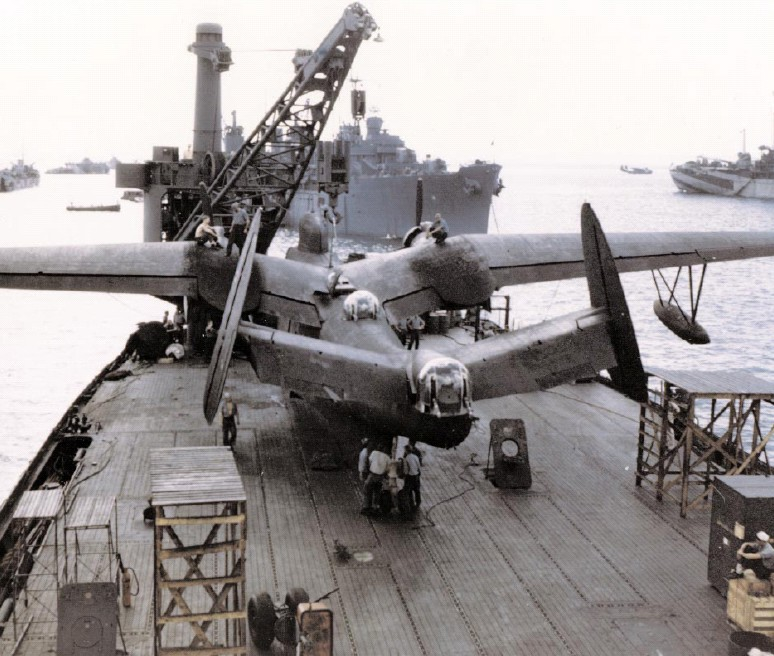
PBM Mariner aboard USS Norton Sound

==== Auxiliary Vessels ====
A large number of ships designed for commercial use were commissioned by the Imperial Japanese Navy for military service as auxiliary forces. These ships played a large role in the battles of the Pacific. At least two dozen merchant vessels are known to have sunk in the waters surrounding Saipan during the war, several of which can be found in the lagoon.

The sites included in the heritage trail are a Japanese Merchant Vessel (presumably Shoan Maru), and a possible Japanese Auxiliary Submarine Chaser.

==== Landing Vehicles ====
Amphibious vehicles including US LVTs (Landing Vehicle, Tracked) and Japanese Daihatsu Landing Craft played pivotal roles in the Battle of Saipan. LVTs were used in the initial invasion forces by the US. They were also known to have provided artillery support during the taking of Garapan, before the U.S. forces moved on to Tanapag.

There are three Landing Vehicles on the World War II heritage trail and they include two Japanese Daihatsu Landing craft and a US LVT(A)-4 (known as the "Marianas Model").

==== Sherman Tanks ====
Three US Sherman Tanks, located within swimming distance of Oleai and Susupe beaches, played a significant role in the initial invasion by US forces. The three tanks are semi-submerged and are a prime attraction for both locals and tourists due to their striking nature with turrets above the water. The area in which the tanks are located has been designated a National Historic Landmark associated with the action that took place on these beaches.

== World War II ==
“The Marianas Campaign, from an amphibious view point had nearly everything; great strategic importance, major tactical moves including successive troop landings on three
enemy islands; tough enemy resistance of all kinds, including major Fleet battle; coordination of every known type of combat technique of the land, sea, and air; difficult
logistic problems; and the buildup of a great military base area concurrently with the fighting.” -

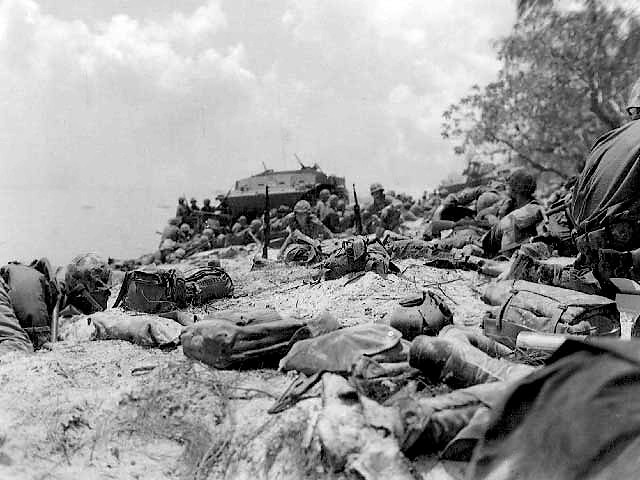
Red Beach D-day Landing

War in the Pacific

Operation Forager

Battle of Saipan

== Marine Protected Areas ==
Saipan is roughly 10 miles long by 5 miles wide and the waters immediately surrounding this small island include eight marine protected areas. The Mañagaha Marine Conservation Area includes several of the heritage trail dive sites.

Official name	Location	Protected Area
Lighthouse Reef Trochus Reserve	15.188014 145.707369, Saipan	Beginning at the Garapan channel marker (Lighthouse) and extending south for one mile. The area encompasses the barrier reef from the innermost edge bordering the lagoon out to the offshore side,
Bird Island Sea Cucumber Reserve	15.257489 145.813726, Bird Island	Coral Reef and tidal pools surrounding limestone rock-island on the North Western side of Saipan
Managaha Marine Conservation Area	15.21806 145.697, Mañagaha	
Laulau Bay Sea Cucumber Reserve	15.132239 145.745714, Saipan	Protected crescent shaped bay containing numerous tide pools and fringed by coral reefs. Beginning at (point) Puntan Hakmang & extending south to Puntan Dandan, the area runs from the mean high-water mark seaward to the 40 foot depth contour.
Tank Beach Trochus Reserve	15.173888 145.786720, Saipan	Crescent shaped bay on the Eastern side of the island, near the town of Kagman.
Kagman Conservation Area	15.185359 145.782236, Saipan	The site consists of 330 acres. Tangantangan forest atop cliff line and adjacent to overlook. Excellent visibility within the coastal waters and fringing reefs.
Forbidden Island Sanctuary	15.1505 145.791, Forbidden Island, Saipan	Fringing coral reefs, volcanic cliffs, and Island plateau habitat.
Bird Island Marine Sanctuary	15.2578 145.814, Bird Island	The site consists of 220 acres of land, including the Grotto, extending from the Bird Island Marine Sanctuary to the Saipan Upland Mitigation Bank
