= Cascade, Colorado =

Unincorporated community in El Paso County, Colorado, USA

- Unincorporated community
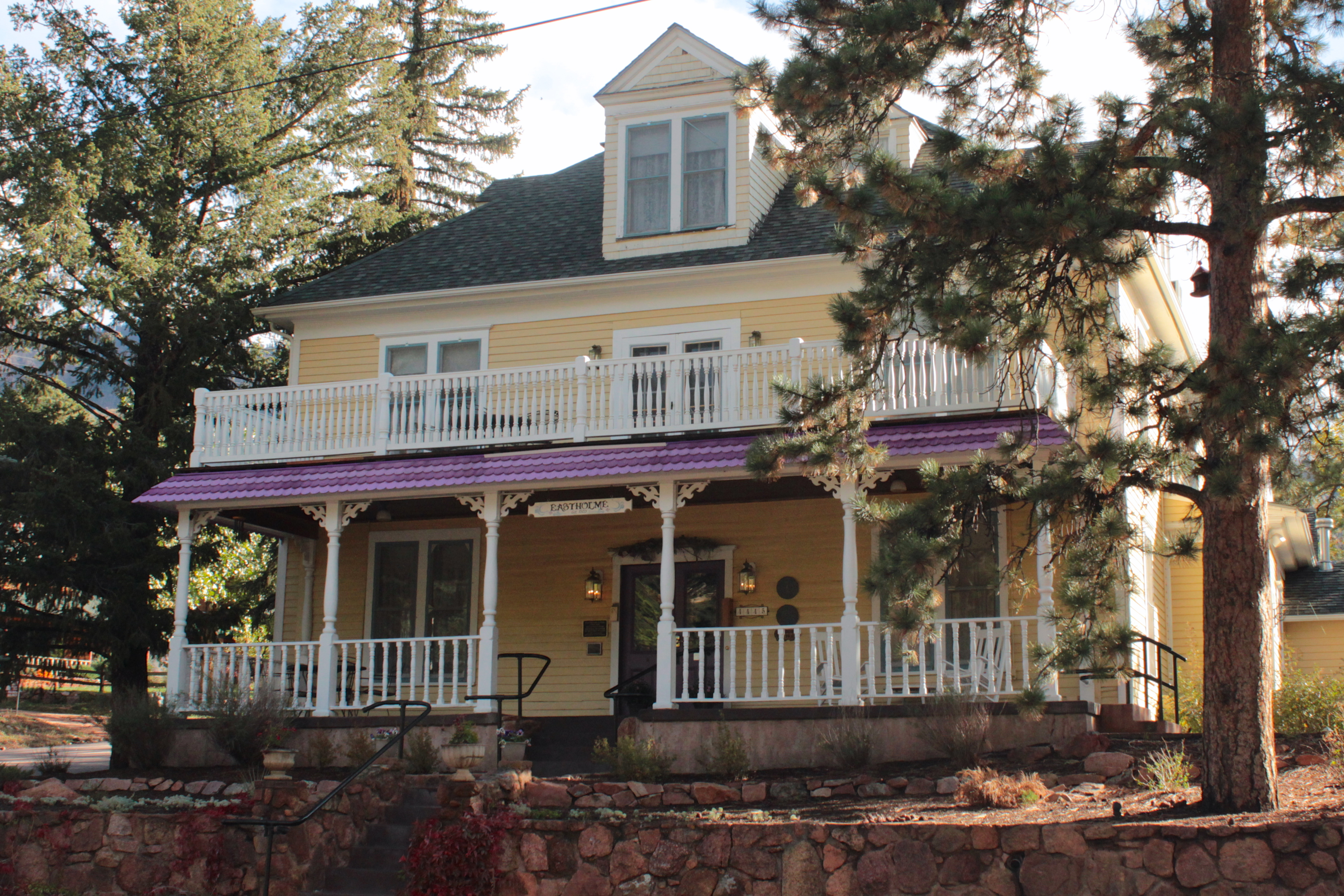
- Eastholme of the Rockies Bed and Breakfast Inn, Cascade

- Location of Cascade, Colorado Cascade (Colorado)
- Coordinates: 38°58′30″N 105°00′08″W
- Country: United States
- State: Colorado
- County: El Paso

Government
  - Type: Unincorporated community
  - Body: El Paso County
- Elevation: 7,379 ft (2,249 m)
- Time zone: UTC−07:00 (MST)
  - Summer (DST): UTC−06:00 (MDT)
- ZIP code: 80809
- Area code: 719
- GNIS CDP ID: 2407982
- FIPS code: FIPS 08 12325

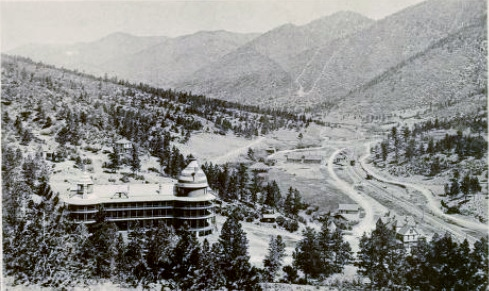
Cascade Canon, Pikes Peak Region series of photographs, Charles S. Lee, 1893. Hotel Ramonda is in the lower left hand corner.

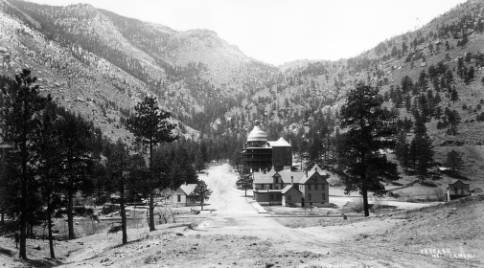
Cascade Canon, William H. Walker, 1889–1890. Western Collection, Denver Public Library

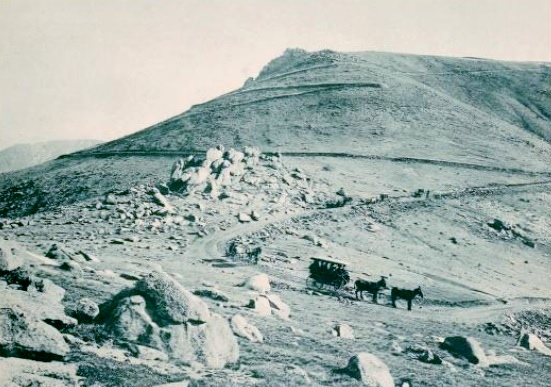
Carriage Road - Pikes Peak series of photographs - Charles S. Lee - 1893

Cascade is an unincorporated community and post office in the Cascade-Chipita Park, CO Census Defined Place in El Paso County, Colorado, United States. The ZIP Code of the Cascade, Colorado, post office is 80809.

== History ==
=== Early settlers ===
The Cascade, Colorado, post office opened on August 16, 1887. Eliza Marriott Hewlett, the oldest of three sisters, left the state of New York for Colorado in the 1880s, and brought her two children with her to Cascade before it was a town. It was quite uncommon for "ladies of leisure" to have moved to Colorado during this period; It was theorized that the women "may have come because of the publicity lent to the area by such romantic writers of the day as Helen Hunt..., who extolled the beauties of the Pikes Peak region." Most of Cascade Canyon was homesteaded by the sisters. Others came to the area for their health or to establish ranches. In the 1880s, there were also people in the Cascade Canyon area that ran businesses delivering supplies via mule trains to the Leadville and Cripple Creek mining towns.

It was a resort town, with 3 hotels, from the 1880s to the 1920s. Tourists traveled through Ute Pass on the Colorado Midland Railway, experiencing scenic views of Cascade canon and its falls during their journey. Carriage tours brought tourists up Pikes Peak to its summit. Tourism fell when the Manitou and Pike's Peak Cog Railway opened in 1892, and tourists were able to travel to the summit of Pikes Peak through Manitou Springs.

When visitors traveled by automobiles, beginning in the 1920s, they had different needs and came in smaller numbers than the previous decades. The Ute Pass region could no longer support large hotels and 2 of the 3 hotels in town were demolished by 1926. Eastholme, a small inn, has been foreclosed and is currently for sale. The Pikes Peak Highway entrance is at Cascade.

=== Railway and Pikes Peak Carriage Road ===
After 1887, the Colorado Midland Railway provided service from Old Colorado City, then Colorado City, west through Ute Pass. A railroad depot, dining hall and water tank were established in Cascade by the railway in 1888.

Views from the train ride through Cascade Canon were McGregor Falls, Lullaby Falls, Dome Rock, Peek-a-Boo Falls, Artist's Glen, Sylvan Nook and Cascade, Twin Cascade, Crystal Spray, Queen of the Canon, Souvenir Falls, The Key Hole, The Stairway, Naiad's Bath, Upper Falls and Grotto Falls.

Cascade canon and its falls were described in 1914:

The canon and falls are rare in beauty and constitute the chief attraction... The canon is about three-quarters of a mile long and very deep; its floor and sides are covered with an exceptionally luxuriant growth of trees, shrubbery, and flowers. This exceptional vegetation is produced by the flow of Cascade creek through the canon and the mist and spray from its falls. Some of these falls are as much as 30 feet in height, but the difference in elevation between the foot and the head of the canon is so great that the falls are almost continuous from the head down. The volume of water is the greatest during the summer season. It comes from the melting snows on the north slope of Pike's Peak.

Thousands of tourists traveled along the Pikes Peak Carriage Road, also known as the Pikes Peak Wagon Road, up to Pikes Peak's summit. Passengers were picked up at a railway stop by awaiting carriages and taken to the summit of Pikes Peak. It was opened by the Cascade Town Company in 1888 and closed in 1902. The carriage road company went bankrupt following the success of the Manitou and Pike's Peak Cog Railway that opened in 1892.

=== Cascade founded ===
The Cascade Town and Improvement Company was founded and, with Eliza Hewlett, contributed to the cost of the development of the Pikes Peak Carriage Road. It purchased land from the Marriott-Hewlett sisters in 1886, shortly thereafter platted the village's roads. The town of Cascade was established in 1886, and was named for the many waterfalls in the area. Ute Park, now Chipita, Green Mountain Falls and Crystola were also developed in this time period.

Eastholme, a boarding room and small hotel was built between 1885 and 1887, by Eliza Marriot Hewlett and her sisters. The Cascade Canyon House was opened by the Cascade Town Company in 1887 and The Ramona House, "the town's centerpiece", was built in 1890 and opened in 1891. Hotel Ramona was a three-story hotel with verandas and a radish-shaped dome and "would dominate the entrance to Cascade Canon. It was named after the book Ramona by Helen Hunt.

People traveled to Cascade during the summers:

It was a place where families -- privileged, cultured, and correct -- returned summer after summer. They hiked and picnicked far up in the canyon. Under the pavilion at Deer Lick Springs, they faithfully sipped mineral waters... They tripped the light fantastic on Saturdays, and they attended musicals in the parlor of the Ramona on Sundays. The young ones danced at the pavilion down by the depot.

The town had natural pure, cold water springs and mineral springs. One of the springs near the Fountain. It contains carbonic acid, potassium, silica, sulfuric acid, iron, lime or calcium, magnesium and sodium. Another is up the canon a short distance and has a high iron content, as well as chlorine, ammonia, sulfuric acid, carbonic acid, lime, magnesia, alumina and soda. There were also 2 or 3 "pure, cold water" springs that were located near the Hotel Ramona.

Mrs. Hewlett has a church built in the area after her sister Caroline was married to an Episcopalian minister.[7]

=== Tourism shifts ===
Eastholme was abandoned in 1918 following the closure of the Colorado Midland Railway. Large hotels "would disappear in the 1920s". In Cascade, the railway depot, dining hall, and the large hotels, Cascade Canyon House and Hotel Ramona, were demolished by 1926. A community house was built on the site of the Cascade Canyon House.

Photograph of Santa's Workshop signage in 1980 by John Margolies

During the 1920s many tourists began to travel by car, rather than train. Eastholme accommodated the travelers, as well as the Red Cloud Inn that opened in 1921.

=== Waldo Canyon Fire of 2012 ===
The town was closest to the origin of the Waldo Canyon Fire in 2012, and volunteer firefighters from Cascade were among the first to respond.

Cascade remains a tourist destination, with visitors staying in inns, bed and breakfasts, cottages and guest houses.

== Geography ==
Cascade is located 2.7 miles (4.3 km) southeast of Chipita Park at coordinates 38.8967°N 104.9722°W at an elevation of 7,379 feet (2,249 m). Fountain Creek flows off the slopes of Pikes Peak into the town, and turns southeast into a canyon. US 24 also runs through the town, paralleling Fountain Creek through the canyon until the exit for Manitou Springs.

Cascade Creek flows down the canyon and into Fountain Creek.

== Demographics ==
See the Cascade-Chipita Park, CO Census Defined Place.

== Flora and fauna ==
The native flora of the canon and its sides is "quite extensive", with at least 200 varieties of vegetation. There are about 50 varieties of perennials, 25 varieties of shrubs, 3 of spruce, 3 of juniper and 3 or 4 of pines. Wild flowers, flowering shrubs, moss, many types of wild berries and other trees and plants are found in the canon.

Grouse, squirrels, birds and some wild animals are native to the canyon.

== Lodging ==
The town's lodging includes Adobe Inn at Cascade, Eastholme in the Rockies bed and breakfast inn, Rocky Mountains Lodge and Cabins, Cascade Escapes, and Happy Trails Vacation Rentals.

== Parks and trails ==
=== Heizer trail ===
Heizer trail leads to local waterfalls in the Cascade Community Park. The trail starts on Anemone Hill Road in Cascade and rises up the side of Cascade Mountain to its summit. It is an old trail that offers views of Pikes Peak and the North Pole Amusement Park. It is about 6 miles round trip.

Hikers can make their way to French Creek trail #703, by following pink-orange ribbons on trees. There is steep descent to reach the trail that connects to Barr Trail.

=== Ute Pass Regional Trail ===
The Ute Pass Regional Trail intends to be a continuous trail from Manitou Springs, west through Ute Pass to Woodland Park. At times, the trail would parallel U.S. Highway 24. In 2012 there were concerns raised about a 3-mile section of the trail, that has been planned to include a trailhead, along a US Highway 24 frontage road in Cascade.

== Organizations ==
The Ute Pass Library is located on Severey Road, off of Ute Pass Avenue. It has children, teen and adult programs. The building has wireless Internet service. The US Post Office is located on Ute Pass Avenue.

Cascade is home to the North Pole amusement park.

== Pikes Peak Highway ==
The Pikes Peak Highway, is a 19-mile (31 km) toll road, originates at Cascade and travels up to the summit of Pikes Peak.

== See also ==
- Cascade-Chipita Park, CO Census Defined Place
