= Mañagaha =

Coordinates: 15.2414°N 145.7127°E

- Mañagaha Island Historic District
- U.S. National Register of Historic Places
- U.S. Historic district
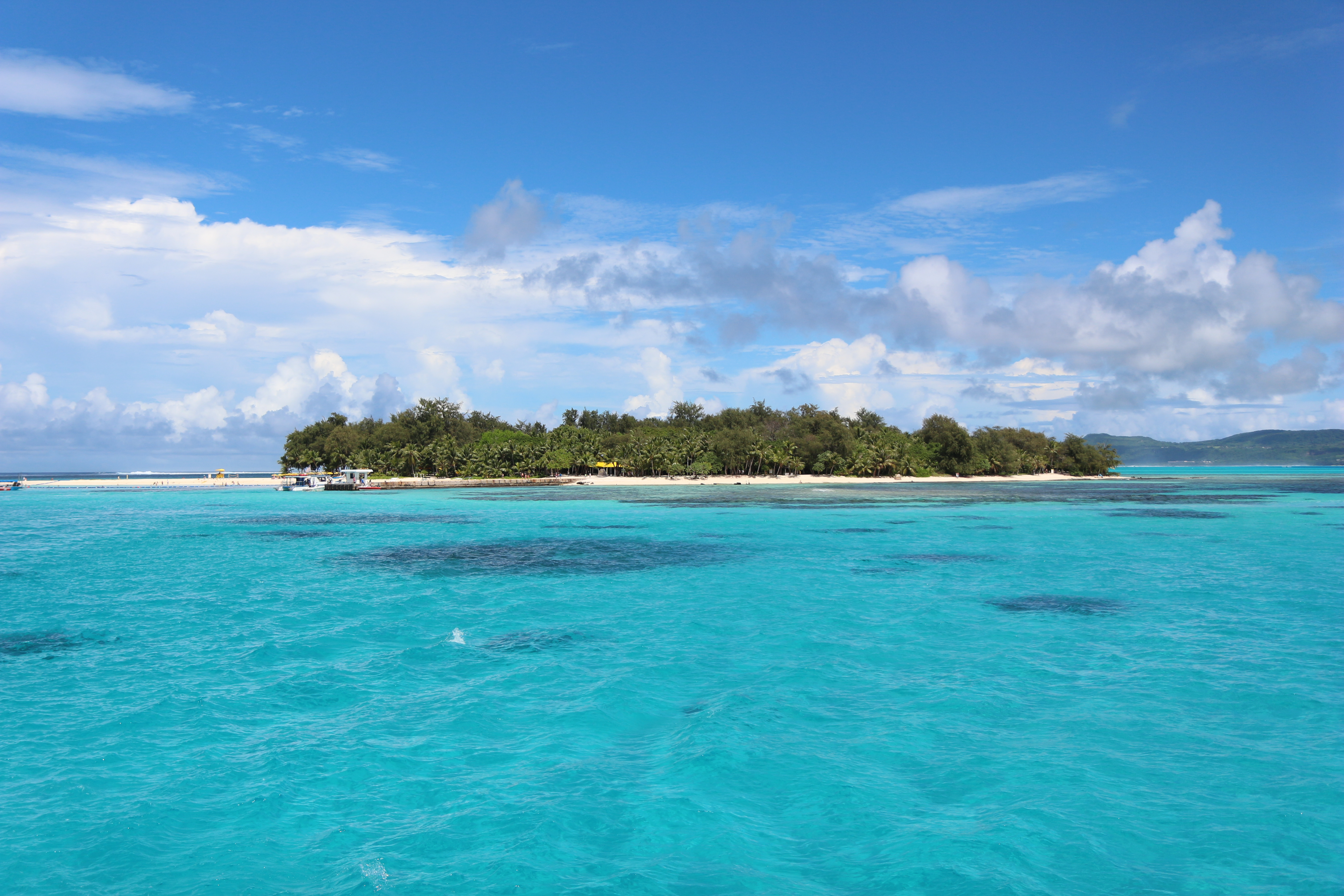
- Mañagaha
- Nearest city: Garapan, Saipan
- Area: 100 acres (40 ha)
- NRHP reference No.: 84000425
- Added to NRHP: November 5, 1984

Mañagaha (or Managaha) is a small islet which lies off the west coast of Saipan within its lagoon in the Northern Mariana Islands. Although it has no permanent residents, Mañagaha is popular among Saipan's tourists as a day-trip destination due to its wide sandy beaches and a number of marine activities including snorkeling, parasailing and jet skiing.

Managaha is one of the most popular tourist attractions on Saipan, known for its views of clear water, beaches, and is accessed by a short ferry ride from Saipan. In the late 2010s it was estimated 70% of the tourists to Saipan also visit Managaha. The small island is ringed by beach circling forested area where there are the facilities.

Mañagaha hosts a colony of breeding Wedge-tailed Shearwaters. This seabird nests in burrows principally on the east side of the island.

The island is historically significant for several reasons. It is the burial ground of the famous Carolinian Chief Aghurubw, who is said to have established the first Carolinian settlement in Saipan in 1815. A statue of the chief commemorates his achievements in leading his people from Satawal after a devastating typhoon to Saipan. The island also has remnants of Japanese fortifications from World War II. The entire island is listed on the United States National Register of Historic Places as a historic district.

One of the popular boats that ferried people to the island was the double-decker boat Jambalaya, which stopped operating in 2019 and was sunk by Typhoon Bolaven in 2023.

In 2023, the island was leased for ten to fifteen years to Mariana Global, Inc. with various conditions; the previous holder was Tasi Tours who had operated the island for twenty years. The South Korean company will be the master master concessionaire, and in planning to have variety of food, facilities, water sport, beach rentals, on tap for tourists and locals.

== Gallery ==
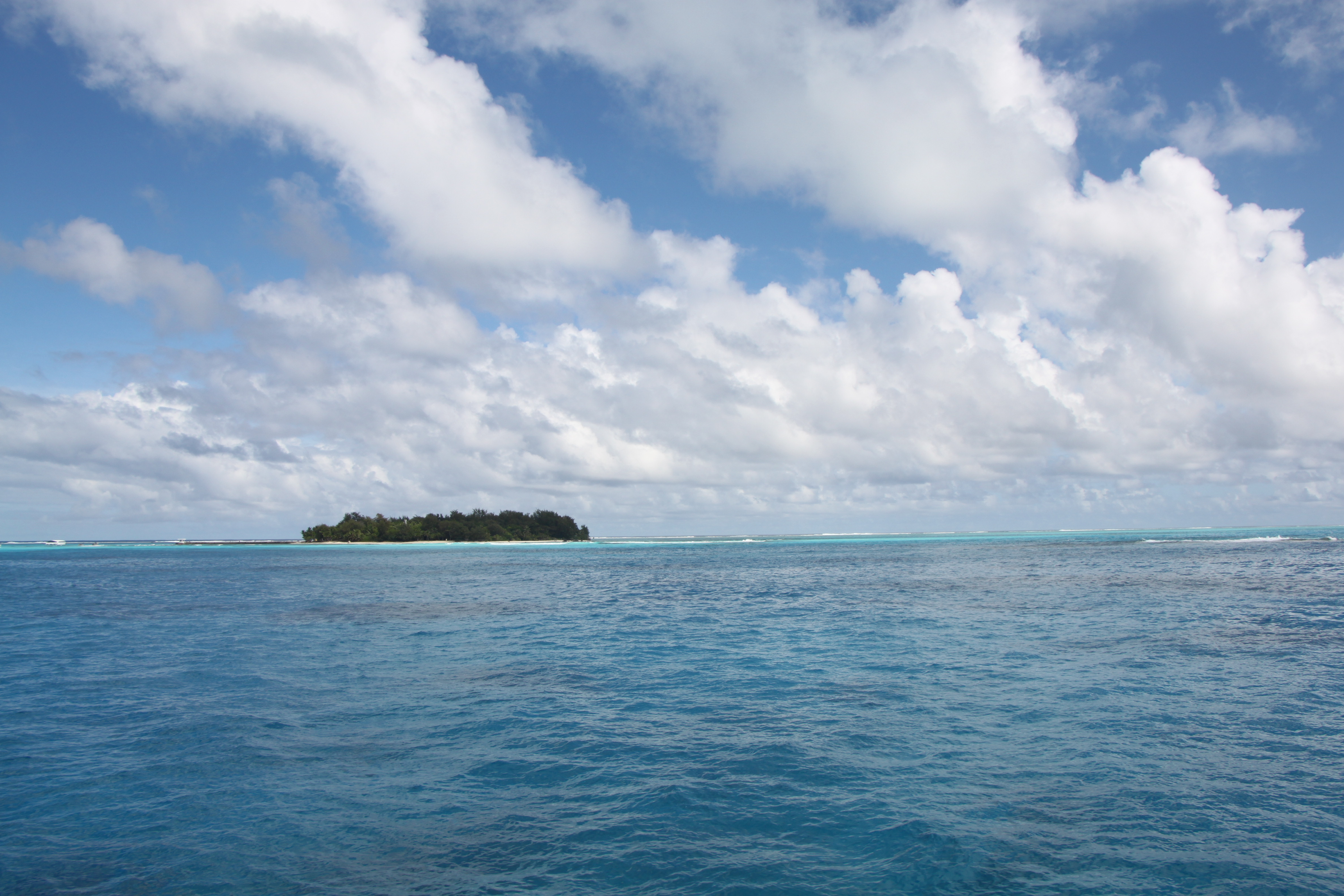

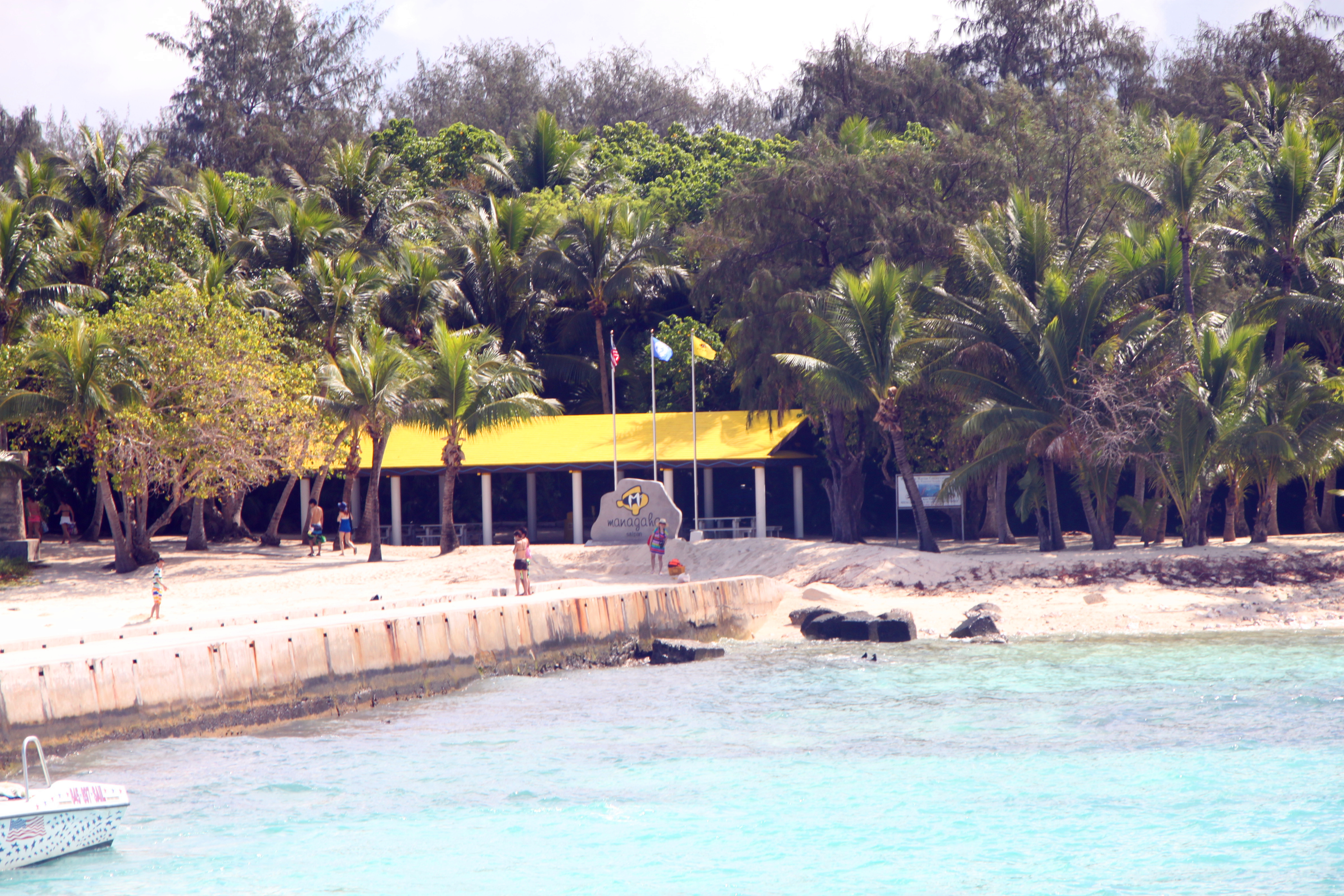

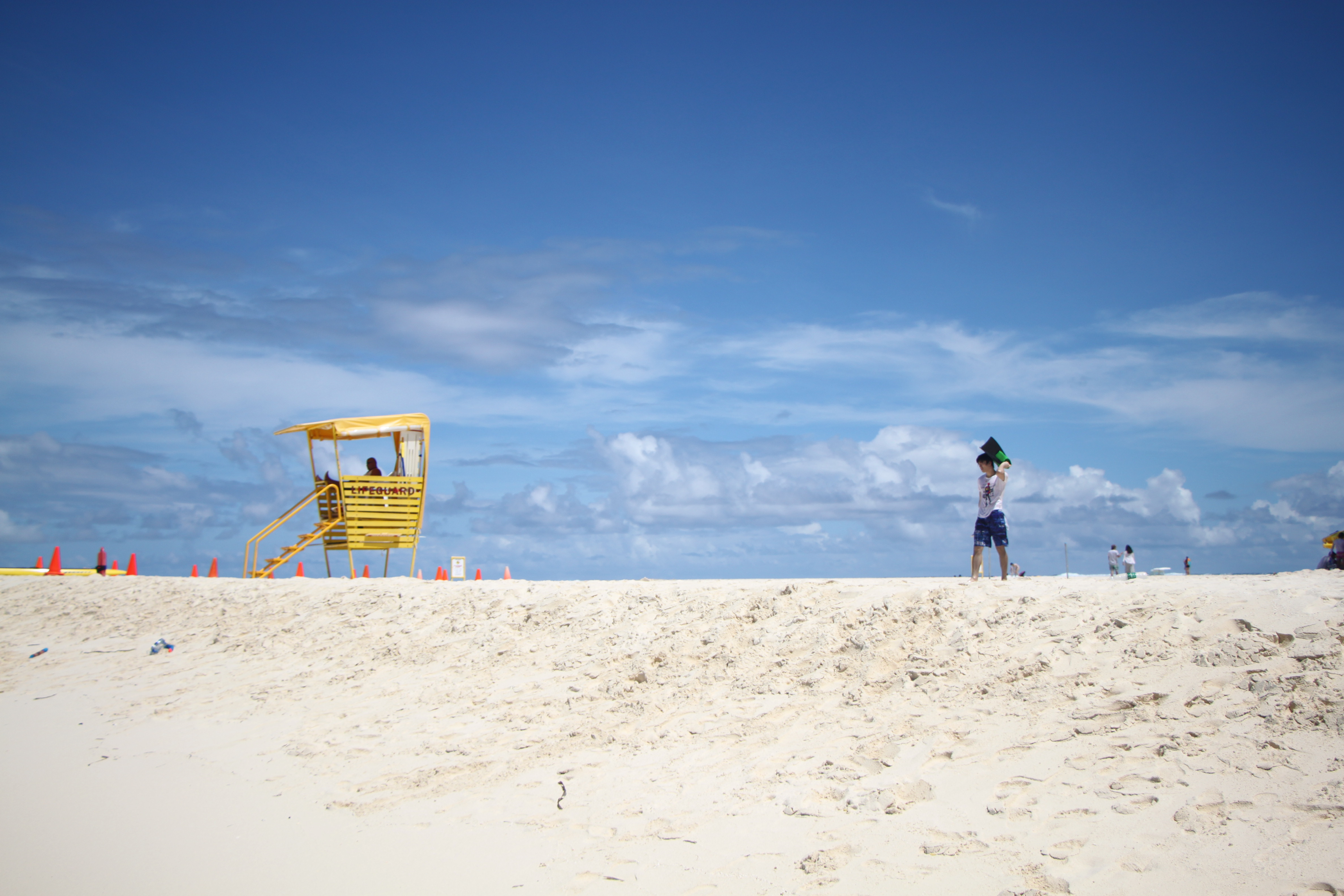

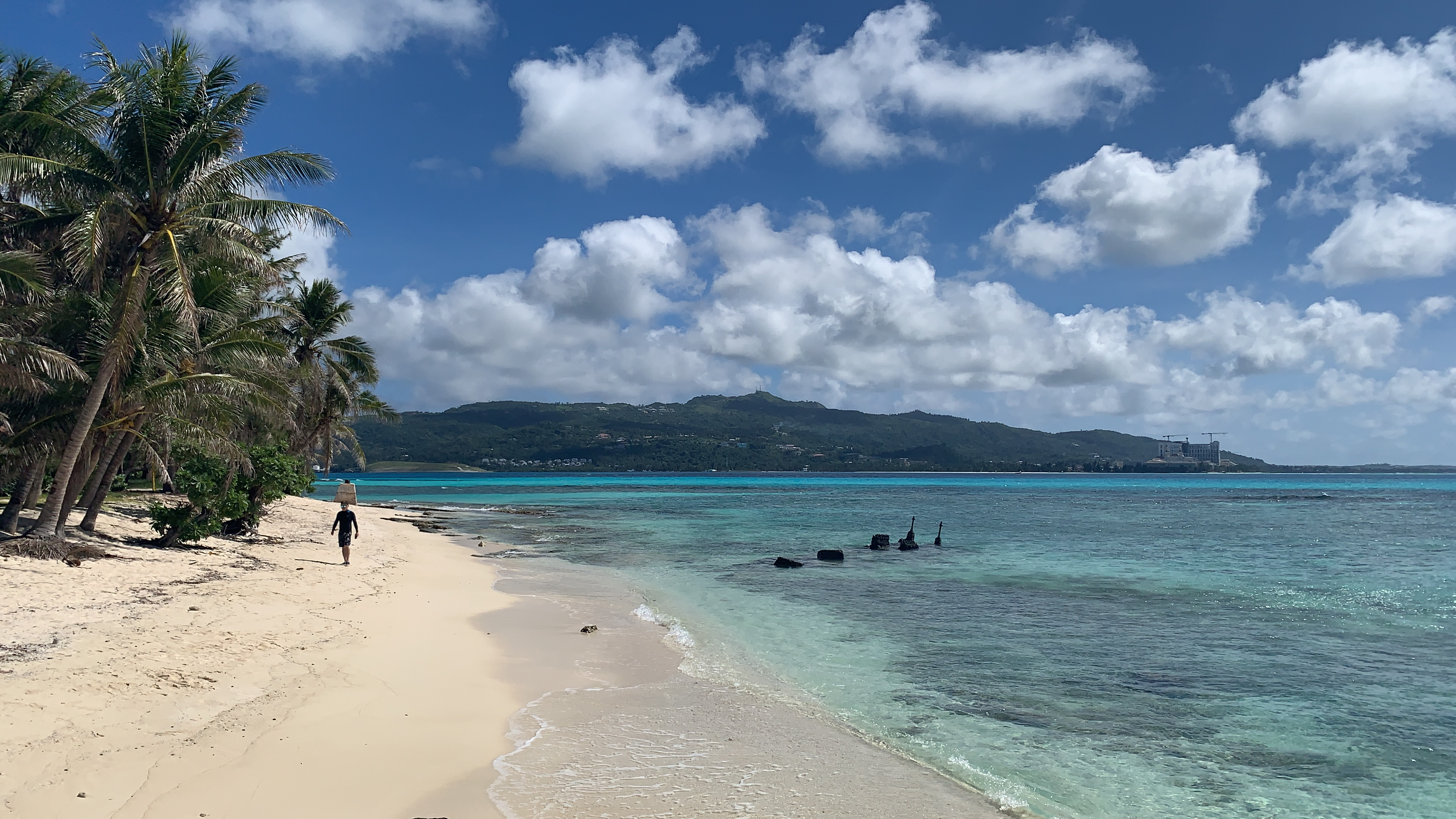

== See also ==
- National Register of Historic Places listings in the Northern Mariana Islands
- Maritime Heritage Trail – Battle of Saipan
