= William Abraham Bell =

English physician (1841–1921)

William Abraham Bell FRGS
- William Abraham Bell, c. 1890
- Born: 26 April 1841; Ireland
- Died: 6 June 1921 (aged 80); England
- Education: University of Cambridge
- Occupations: Physician, photographer, Colorado businessman and developer

William Abraham Bell (26 April 1841 – 6 June 1921), fellow of the Royal Geographical Society, was an English physician who is best known as a photographer of the American West as well as a founder and developer of businesses and towns in Colorado, including Colorado Springs, Manitou Springs, and Durango.

== Early life ==
Bell was born in Ireland in 1841, the son of an English physician named William Bell. He studied medicine at Cambridge University and practised at St George's Hospital in London after earning his medical degree.

== Kansas Pacific Railway survey ==
In 1867, Bell travelled to the United States to study the medical principles of homoeopathy in St. Louis. In the United States, he joined an expedition undertaken by the Union Pacific Railroad Eastern Division (later Kansas Pacific Railway) to identify and map a southern route for a railroad connection between Kansas and California. Although Bell had no experience in photography, he was recommended for the post of expedition photographer by the expedition's geologist, John Lawrence LeConte. Accordingly, he undertook a two-week crash course in photography, purchased a camera and darkroom equipment, and joined the expedition in western Kansas, in a region near the Colorado state line that was the scene of active fighting between local Indians and United States military forces.

Soon after his arrival in Kansas, Bell saw and photographed the mutilated body of Sergeant Frederick Wyllyams, a U.S. soldier who had been killed by Indians. The gruesome image was published in Harper's Weekly, which railroad officials considered to be bad publicity and which caused them to become concerned that Bell intended to make money from sale of expedition photos. The railroad hired Alexander Gardner to be chief photographer for the survey expedition. However, the expedition split into two parties, and for a time Bell continued his photographic work as a member of the southern party that scouted a route through New Mexico and west along the 32nd parallel, while Gardner was part of the northern party that followed the 35th parallel. As an expedition member, Bell formed a friendship with the expedition's leader, General William J. Palmer, who was later to become his partner in several business ventures.

After about six months' work, Bell separated from the expedition at Camp Grant in southern Arizona, abandoning his equipment and negatives to travel on horseback to the coast of Mexico. From there, he travelled by ship to San Francisco and made an overland crossing of the United States to return to the east coast, where he obtained passage back to England.

He described his experience in the survey expedition in an 1869 book, New Tracks in North America. Published at a time when few Americans had seen the country west of the Mississippi River, the book sold well in both Great Britain and the United States. Meanwhile, the approximately 100 photographs that he left with the expedition were of little use to the railroad, whose officials found that they were carelessly finished and that many of them had insufficient lighting. Only two of his images were included in the compilation that Alexander Gardner produced after the conclusion of the expedition. Some of his photographic work survives in collections, including those of the Colorado Historical Society.

== Business activities in Colorado ==
Palmer and Bell shared a vision of building a corporate empire and formed a business partnership. Both were astute businessmen and complemented each other. Together they founded the Denver and Rio Grande Railroad, and Bell and Palmer went on to found some 30 businesses.

After the Denver and Rio Grande Railroad built a spur into Manitou Springs, an aggressive marketing campaign was started to promote the health benefits of the resort, which was successful and came to be known as "Saratoga of the West", making an analogy to Saratoga Springs, New York.

In early 1872 Bell visited England, where he married Cara Scovell. In the summer of that year, he returned to Colorado with his new wife and they started construction of a new Victorian home on the banks of Fountain Creek in Manitou Springs. Their home, known as Briarhurst Manor, was completed in 1876.

Easterners and investors from England arrived in a steady stream, and an entire community sprang up around the fashionable health resort. The town was designed like a European spa with luxury hotels, parks and shops. The hotels provided entertainment, hiring the popular bands of the day for dances. Wealthy visitors often brought their families and household staff and stayed for months at a time.

== Final years ==
By 1890, Bell had liquidated many of his holdings in the United States, whereupon he retired to England, entrusting the Briarhurst Estate to a pair of long-term employees.

Around 1899, he invested some of his money in the Mobile Company of America, founded by magazine publisher, developer, and automobile enthusiast John Brisben Walker. Walker acquired the Stanley Brothers patents, bought parts of the former Ambrose Kingsland estate in North Tarrytown, New York, and built there a large factory to produce steam-powered "Mobiles." Walker began subdividing the northern segment of his North Tarrytown land, attempting to capitalize on the site's location along the Hudson River Railroad. One of his selling points for the residential development, called Philipse Manor in a confused reference to nearby Philipsburg Manor House, was the rail access, but this failed to materialize. The Mobile Company of America also failed: steam-powered carriages proved to be inferior to gasoline internal combustion vehicles. The heavily indebted Walker had to sell the North Tarrytown property to Bell, his investor. Drawing on his extensive experience in railroad development, Bell not only continued the residential construction at Philipse Manor but also made the rail service possible by building the station and presenting it to the railroad. Wealthy New Yorkers started eagerly buying homes in Philipse Manor. (Today, the picturesque neighborhood is part of the village of Sleepy Hollow, and the Philipse Manor station is on the National Register of Historic Places.) In 1914, Bell "swapped" the Philipse Manor property for a New York City skyscraper, the Jewelry Building at 303 Fifth Avenue, which was still owned by his descendants as of 2025.

The Bells paid a last visit to Briarhurst and their Manitou resort in March 1920. Dr. Bell announced to newspaper reporters that this would be his last trip, saying he was no longer able to take the long sea voyage back and forth to England. On 6 June 1921, Bell died at the age of 81 of a heart condition. Cara lived until 1938, to the age of 85.

== Works ==
- William A. Bell (1869), New tracks in North America: A Journal of Travel and Adventure Whilst Engaged in the Survey for a Southern Railroad to the Pacific Ocean during 1867–8 Chapman and Hall.
- Shadrick K. Hooper, William Abraham Bell, Stanley Wood (c. 1890). The story of Manitou. Published by Denver and Rio Grande Railroad Company.
- William A. Bell, Address by Dr. William A. Bell at a dinner given to the employees of the Denver & Rio Grande Railroad at the Union Station, Denver, Colorado, January 28, 1920.

== Arms ==
Coat of arms of William Abraham Bell
Crest On a wreath of the colours a figure of Justice vested chevronnt of six Argent and Gules. Escutcheon Azure a chevron Ermine between in chief two bells and in base a fleau Or. Motto Hujus Stat Foedere Mundus
