= Justin Armour =

American football player (born 1973)

No. 81, 86, 83, 88
- Position: Wide receiver

Personal information
- Born: January 1, 1973 (age 53); Colorado Springs, Colorado, U.S.
- Listed height: 6 ft 4 in (1.93 m)
- Listed weight: 215 lb (98 kg)

Career information
- High school: Manitou Springs (Manitou Springs, Colorado)
- College: Stanford
- NFL draft: 1995: 4th round, 113th overall pick
- Expansion draft: 1999: 1st round, 16th overall pick

Career history
- Buffalo Bills (1995–1996); Philadelphia Eagles (1997); San Francisco 49ers (1997); Denver Broncos (1998); Cleveland Browns (1999)*; Baltimore Ravens (1999); Seattle Seahawks (2000)*
- * Offseason or practice squad member only

Awards and highlights
- Super Bowl champion (XXXIII); First-team All-Pac-10 (1994); Second-team All-Pac-10 (1993)

Career NFL statistics
- Receptions: 64
- Receiving yards: 861
- Receiving touchdowns: 7
- Stats at Pro Football Reference

Justin Hugh Armour (born January 1, 1973) is an American former professional football player who played wide receiver for three seasons for the Buffalo Bills, Denver Broncos, and Baltimore Ravens. He is also the former head coach of both the Manitou Springs High School football and girls' basketball teams in Manitou Springs, Colorado.

== Early life ==
Justin was a consensus All-American with the Manitou Springs Mustangs. In high school, he helped the Mustangs to a AA boys basketball final four appearance, a AA state track and field championship in the spring of 1990, and a AAA state championship in the fall of 1990. The Mustangs football team primarily ran the Single-wing formation which fit Justin's extensive athletic abilities. Justin was coached by George Rykovich. Justin was recruited by numerous schools to play college football, namely University of Notre Dame and the University of Colorado Boulder.

== College career ==
Justin received an athletic scholarship to play both football and basketball at Stanford University. While recruited as a quarterback, he played four years at wide receiver for the Cardinal coached by Bill Walsh and two years of basketball. As a sophomore, he received an honorable mention All-Pac-10. As a junior, he was selected as All-Pac-10 second-team. As a senior, he ranked ninth in the nation and second in the Pac-10 in receptions. He is fourth in career receiving yards for the Cardinal with 2,491 and fifth in career touchdowns with 20.

== Professional career ==
Pre-draft measurables
Height	Weight	Arm length	Hand span	40-yard dash	10-yard split	20-yard split	20-yard shuttle	Vertical jump
6 ft 4 5/8 in (1.95 m)	221 lb (100 kg)	32 in (0.81 m)	10 1/2 in (0.27 m)	4.71 s	1.68 s	2.75 s	4.04 s	32.5 in (0.83 m)
All values from NFL Combine

Justin was drafted in the fourth round (113th overall) of the 1995 NFL draft by the Buffalo Bills. He was a member of the Denver Broncos Super Bowl XXXIII championship team, defeating the Atlanta Falcons 34-19.
