= Manitou Springs High School =

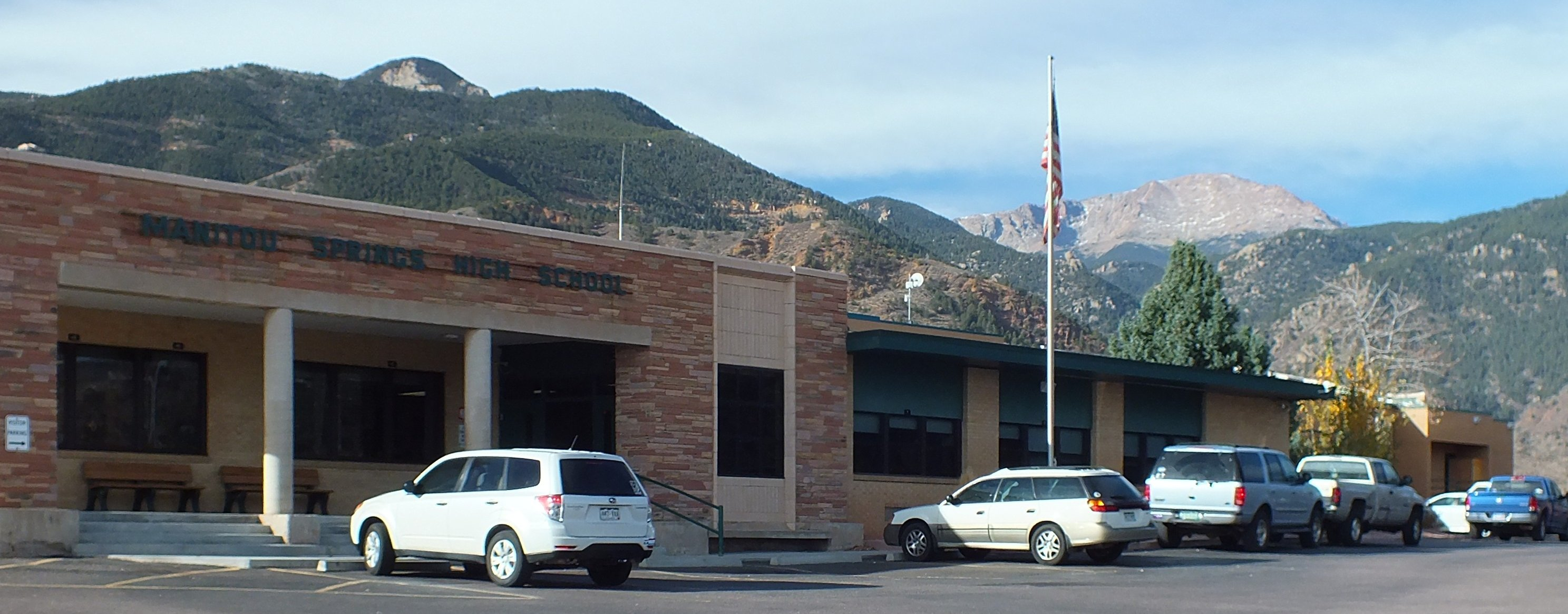
- Front of the school

Location
- 401 El Monte Place; Manitou Springs, Colorado 80829; United States
- Coordinates: 38°51′21″N 104°54′12″W

Information
- School type: Public high school
- School district: Manitou Springs 14
- CEEB code: 060970
- NCES School ID: 080549000946
- Principal: Anna Conrad
- Teaching staff: 33.00 (on an FTE basis)
- Grades: 9–12
- Enrollment: 400 (2023–2024)
- Student to teacher ratio: 12.12
- Colors: Green and gold
- Athletics conference: CHSAA
- Mascot: Mustang
- Feeder schools: Manitou Springs Middle School
- Website: msh.mssd14.org

Manitou Springs High School (MSHS) is a public high school in Manitou Springs, Colorado, United States. It is the only high school in the Manitou Springs School District 14. The high school has the highest graduation rate in the Pikes Peak Region and one of the lowest remediation rates for students entering college. Manitou teachers give students the option to prepare for the Advanced Placement testing in multiple subjects.

== Notable alumni ==
- Justin Armour (class of 1991), former NFL football player
- Geoff Stults (class of 1994), actor
- George Stults (class of 1993), actor
- Atiba Jefferson (class of 1994), photographer and skateboarder
