= Tanapag Harbor =

Harbor on Saipan, Northern Mariana Islands, US

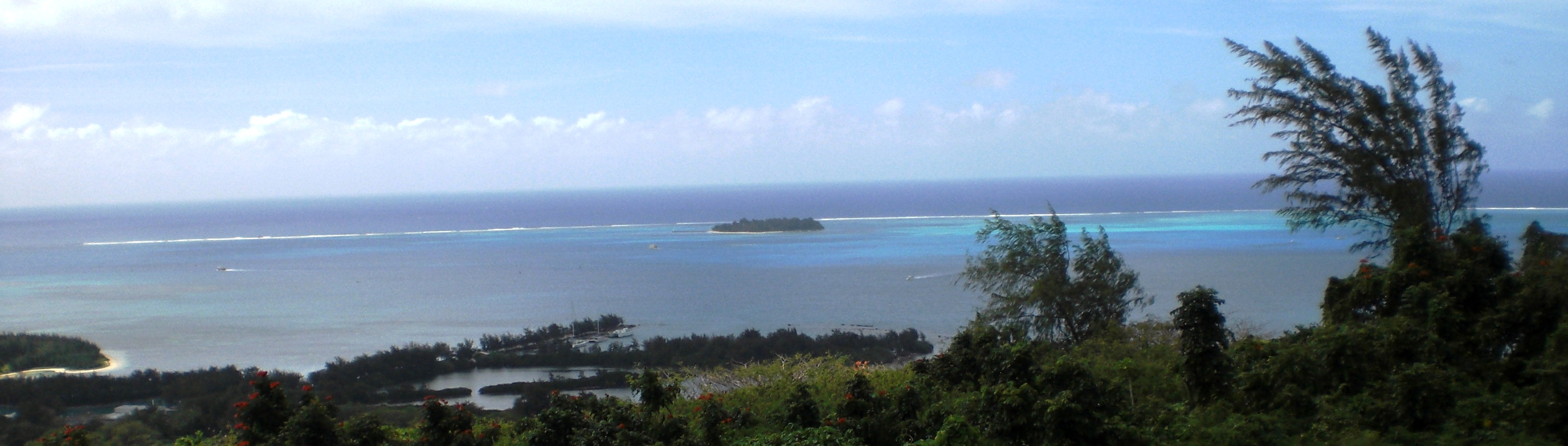
Tanapag harbor with Managaha island

Tanapag Harbor (15°13′36″N 145°44′12″E) is the primary harbor of Saipan, and is located on the western side of the island in the city of Tanapag. It is separated from the Philippine Sea by a barrier reef, located about 3 km (2 miles) off the shore. This reef forms the Saipan Lagoon.

During World War II the harbor was occupied and used by Japan and later the United States as Naval Advance Base Saipan with the code name Dugout Zero. Following the war the harbor facilities have been significantly expanded to provide support for the United States Navy.

This port is also called Puetton Tanapag, or the inner harbor.

The harbor should not be confused with the similarly named popular introductory SCUBA diving site at Tanapag Beach. Dive sites of saipan

== See also ==
- Maritime Heritage Trail – Battle of Saipan
