= Manitou Springs, Colorado =

City in Colorado, United States

- Home rule municipality
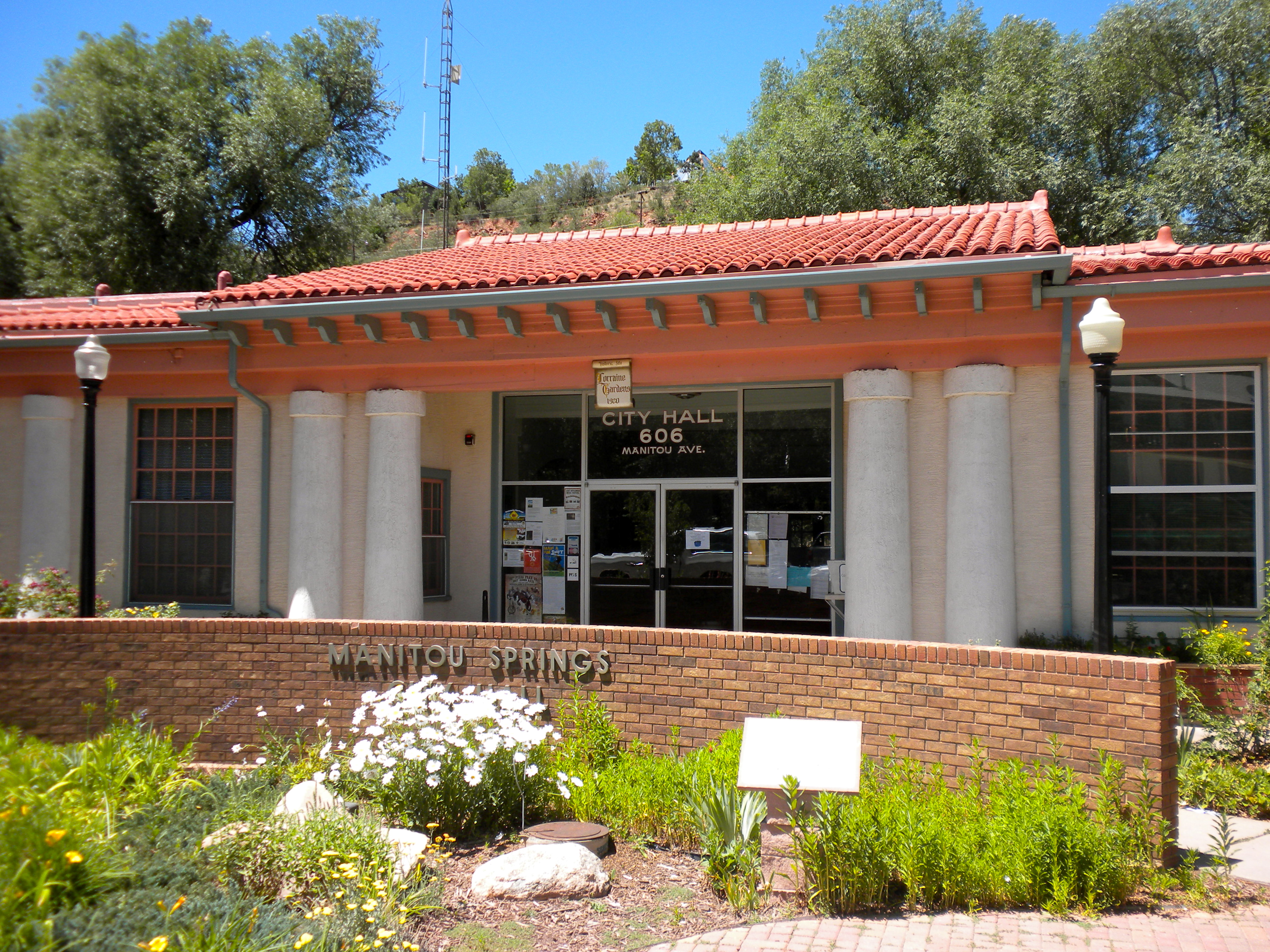
- The Manitou Springs City Hall

- Flag
- Motto: At the foot of Pikes Peak
- Location of the City of Manitou Springs in El Paso County, Colorado
- Coordinates: 38°51′27″N 104°54′46″W
- Country: United States
- State: Colorado
- County: El Paso County
- City: Manitou Springs
- Incorporated: January 25, 1888

Government
  - Type: Home rule municipality
  - Mayor: Natalie Johnson

Area
  - Total: 3.15 sq mi (8.16 km^{2})
  - Land: 3.15 sq mi (8.16 km^{2})
  - Water: 0 sq mi (0.00 km^{2})
- Elevation: 6,306 ft (1,922 m)

Population (2020)
  - Total: 4,858
  - Density: 1,540/sq mi (595/km^{2})
- Time zone: UTC-7 (MST)
  - Summer (DST): UTC-6 (MDT)
- ZIP code: 80829
- Area code: 719
- FIPS code: 08-48445
- GNIS feature ID: 2411021
- Website: www.manitouspringsco.gov

Manitou Springs is a home rule municipality located at the foot of Pikes Peak in western El Paso County, Colorado, United States. The town was founded for its natural mineral springs. The downtown area continues to be of interest to travelers, particularly in the summer, with many shops and restaurants, as well as a creekside city park. The main road through the center of town was one of the direct paths to the base of Pikes Peak. Barr Trail, which winds its way up Pikes Peak, is accessible from town. The subdivision Crystal Hills was added to the municipality in the 1960s.

The city population was 4,858 at the 2020 United States census. Students are served by Manitou Springs School District 14 and Manitou Springs High School.

== History ==
General William Jackson Palmer and Dr. William Abraham Bell founded Manitou Springs in 1872, intending the town to be a "scenic health resort". Bell's home, Briarhurst Manor, is open to the public as a fine dining restaurant, which is listed on the National Register of Historic places. In 1876, the town was incorporated. "Manitou Springs has been the quintessential tourist town since the 1870s, when visitors discovered the healing waters the Ute Indians had been drinking for years. Many of the town's mineral springs still function today and the water is free."

=== Historic district ===
In 1980, the Manitou Springs Historic District was formed by the Historic Preservation Committee to manage development, renovation and preservation within the town. It is a National Register of Historic Places listing and one of the country's largest National Historic Districts.

=== Waldo Canyon fire ===
In June 2012, the entire city was evacuated due to the Waldo Canyon fire nearby. Parts of western Colorado Springs were also evacuated. Manitou Springs did not suffer any fire damage, and the city was under evacuation orders from only 1:30 a.m. Monday until 8 p.m. the same day. There was no fire damage visible from Manitou Springs, and all businesses reopened.

=== Waldo Canyon flash flood ===
On the afternoon of August 9, 2013, the city was inundated by a flash flood entering the northern edges of the city via roadways and natural channels as it descended from the flooded-out US Hwy 24. Traffic was stopped in both directions as the highway barriers formed a river drifting several occupied cars down a runoff ditch. The strong current made a path down Manitou Avenue from Cavern Gulch, as well as Canon Avenue, meandering turbulently through streets, homes, businesses, and spillways, damaging 20 homes, 8 of them significantly. The flood water threatened buildings and parking lots along Fountain Creek, and closed a portion of Manitou Avenue, which reopened later that evening.

== Geography ==
Situated directly along U.S. Route 24 just west of Old Colorado City and Cave of the Winds, the town is bordered by Mt. Manitou to the west, Red Mountain to the south, and Englemann Canyon, south and west. It is near Garden of the Gods, with the same red stone as Red Mountain, and is at the base of Pikes Peak. According to the United States Census Bureau, the city has a total area of 3.2 square miles (8.2 km^{2}), all of it land.

=== Climate ===
Manitou Springs has a humid continental climate (Koppen: Dfb), categorized by four distinct seasons. Summertime is hot, and wintertime is cool, sometimes cold. Spring and fall are generally very pleasant.

Climate data for Manitou Springs, Colorado
Month	Jan	Feb	Mar	Apr	May	Jun	Jul	Aug	Sep	Oct	Nov	Dec	Year
Record high °F (°C)	73 (23)	76 (24)	81 (27)	87 (31)	94 (34)	100 (38)	100 (38)	99 (37)	94 (34)	86 (30)	78 (26)	77 (25)	100 (38)
Mean daily maximum °F (°C)	43 (6)	45 (7)	52 (11)	60 (16)	69 (21)	79 (26)	85 (29)	82 (28)	75 (24)	63 (17)	51 (11)	42 (6)	62 (17)
Mean daily minimum °F (°C)	18 (−8)	20 (−7)	26 (−3)	33 (1)	43 (6)	51 (11)	57 (14)	56 (13)	47 (8)	36 (2)	25 (−4)	18 (−8)	36 (2)
Record low °F (°C)	−26 (−32)	−27 (−33)	−11 (−24)	−3 (−19)	21 (−6)	32 (0)	42 (6)	39 (4)	22 (−6)	5 (−15)	−8 (−22)	−24 (−31)	−27 (−33)
Average precipitation inches (mm)	0.32 (8.1)	0.36 (9.1)	1.00 (25)	1.42 (36)	2.03 (52)	2.50 (64)	2.84 (72)	3.34 (85)	1.19 (30)	0.82 (21)	0.40 (10)	0.34 (8.6)	16.56 (421)
Source: Weather.com

== Government ==
Manitou Springs is a local government and a home rule city located within the Colorado Springs metropolitan area.

=== City council ===
Manitou Springs is managed by the elected mayor and six city council members. The mayor is elected to a two-year term. Council members are elected to 4-year overlapping terms. Three council members are "at large" members and three members represent one of each of the 3 wards in Manitou Springs. Manitou Springs residents may attend the following meetings or working sessions held each month at the Council Chambers at 606 Manitou Avenue.

1st Tuesday	2nd Tuesday	3rd Tuesday	4th Tuesday
City Council meeting	Working session	City Council meeting	Optional working session

=== City boards and commissions ===
The Manitou Springs City Boards and Commissions include:

- Business Improvement District sponsors events and promotions to encourage tourism and business within Manitou Springs. It was also formed to "improve the cleanliness, safety, and marketability of the Downtown Historic District."
- Fountain Creek Restoration Committee
- Historic Preservation Commission manages development, restoration and preservation of the Historic District.
- Housing Advisory Board
- iManitou including the Chamber of Commerce, Office of Economic Development and Visitors Bureau.
- Metro Parking District, which operates parking lots.
- Mineral Springs Foundation was organized to "restore, protect and publicize the natural mineral springs".
- Open Space Advisory Committee was formed to acquire open space.
- Park and Recreation Advisory Board is charged with the enhancement and promotion of the local parks and trails.
- Parking Authority Board
- Planning Commission, with the objective of "guiding and accomplishing a coordinated, well adjusted and harmonious development of the City and its environs."
- Urban Renewal Authority Board to oversee the "redevelopment of the east end of Manitou Avenue."

== Demographics ==
Historical population
Census	Pop.	Note	%±
1880	422		—
1890	1,439		241.0%
1900	1,303		−9.5%
1910	1,357		4.1%
1920	1,129		−16.8%
1930	1,205		6.7%
1940	1,462		21.3%
1950	2,580		76.5%
1960	3,626		40.5%
1970	4,278		18.0%
1980	4,475		4.6%
1990	4,535		1.3%
2000	4,980		9.8%
2010	4,992		0.2%
2020	4,858		−2.7%
U.S. Decennial Census

=== 2020 census ===
As of the 2020 census, Manitou Springs had a population of 4,858. The median age was 47.8 years. 13.6% of residents were under the age of 18 and 21.8% of residents were 65 years of age or older. For every 100 females there were 97.3 males, and for every 100 females age 18 and over there were 99.0 males age 18 and over.

98.8% of residents lived in urban areas, while 1.2% lived in rural areas.

There were 2,438 households in Manitou Springs, of which 18.3% had children under the age of 18 living in them. Of all households, 40.0% were married-couple households, 25.4% were households with a male householder and no spouse or partner present, and 27.2% were households with a female householder and no spouse or partner present. About 38.1% of all households were made up of individuals and 13.0% had someone living alone who was 65 years of age or older.

There were 2,675 housing units, of which 8.9% were vacant. The homeowner vacancy rate was 1.0% and the rental vacancy rate was 4.6%.

Racial composition as of the 2020 census
Race	Number	Percent
White	4,215	86.8%
Black or African American	60	1.2%
American Indian and Alaska Native	39	0.8%
Asian	54	1.1%
Native Hawaiian and Other Pacific Islander	9	0.2%
Some other race	81	1.7%
Two or more races	400	8.2%
Hispanic or Latino (of any race)	337	6.9%

=== 2000 census ===
As of the census of 2000, there were 4,980 people, 2,452 households, and 1,255 families residing in the city. The population density was 1,642.6 inhabitants per square mile (634.2/km^{2}). There were 2,654 housing units at an average density of 875.4/sq mi (338.0/km^{2}). The racial makeup of the city was 93.98% White, 3.65% Hispanic or Latino, 0.50% African American, 1.06% Native American, 1.12% Asian, 0.12% Pacific Islander, 0.94% from other races, and 2.27% from two or more races.

There were 2,452 households, out of which 22.0% had children under the age of 18 living with them; 40.2% were married couples living together' 8.2% had a female householder with no husband present; and 48.8% were non-families. 38.2% of all households were made up of individuals, and 7.3% had someone living alone who was 65 years of age or older. The average household size was 2.03 and the average family size was 2.73.

In the city, the population was spread out, with 18.6% under the age of 18, 7.2% from 18 to 24, 31.6% from 25 to 44, 32.2% from 45 to 64, and 10.3% who were 65 years of age or older. The median age was 41 years. For every 100 females, there were 94.9 males. For every 100 females age 18 and over, there were 92.5 males.

The median income for a household in the city was $40,514, and the median income for a family was $57,260. Males had a median income of $39,102 versus $24,286 for females. The per capita income for the city was $24,492. About 4.7% of families and 7.9% of the population were below the poverty line, including 4.3% of those under age 18 and 10.1% of those age 65 or over.

== Attractions and community events ==
=== Attractions ===
Attractions include:

- Cave of the Winds, cave complex; tours given daily
- The Iron Springs Chateau Melodrama Dinner Theater, located on Ruxton Avenue, is a dinner theatre for families and adults.
- Manitou Cliff Dwellings, a full-size replica of Anasazi Indian cliff dwellings, as well as a museum. The cliff dwellings were built in the early 1900s, using materials from ruined cliff dwellings in the Four Corners area.
- Manitou and Pike's Peak Railway, extending from Manitou Springs to the top of Pikes Peak
- Manitou Springs Food Tour
- Manitou Springs Heritage Center
- Miramont Castle and Manitou Springs Fire Department Museum
- Rainbow Falls (aka Graffiti Falls) is a waterfall on Fountain Creek where there is a large amount of colorful graffiti painted on the canyon walls and bridge overpass.

=== Mineral springs and parks ===
- The Springsabouts Walking Tours, a tour of nine of the Manitou Mineral Springs sites offered by the Mineral Springs Foundation. People can also take their own tour of the springs by visiting The Manitou Springs Chamber of Commerce & Visitors Bureau to pick up a free mineral-springs brochure, content chart and a sampling cup.
- Parks, from east to west along Manitou Avenue, include Schryver Park, Memorial Park, Mansions Park, and Soda Springs Park. Fields Community Park is located on El Paso Boulevard. Seven Minute Gazebo is located behind Mansions and Memorial Parks.
- There are a total of eight springs throughout town, each with their own mineral properties.
- Manitou Incline, a former incline railway bed that rises over 2,000 feet above Manitou Springs is a popular hiking and fitness activity.

=== Events ===
Annual events include:

January

- The Great Fruitcake Toss
- Historic Speaker series

February

- Mumbo Jumbo Gumbo cook off
- Mardi Gras Parade
- Historic Speaker series

March

- Historic Speaker series

April

- 9 News Health Fair
- Historic Speaker series

June

- Colorado Wine Festival
- Garden of the Gods 10 Mile Run
- Clayfest, Potter's competition
- Pikes Peak International Hill Climb
- Summer concert series at Soda Springs Park

July

- July 4 Fireworks
- Ice Cream Social and Pie Baking Contest
- Pikes Peak Cycling Hill Climb
- Summer concert series at Soda Springs Park

August

- Buddy Walk
- Craft Lager Festival
- Pikes Peak Ascent and Marathon
- Mountain Music Festival
- Summer concert series at Soda Springs Park

September

- Commonwheel Arts and Crafts Festival
- Pikes Peak Challenge
- ArtWalk Weekend

October

- Emma Crawford Memorial Coffin Races.
- Emma's Wake
- Ghost Tours
- Authorfest of the Rockies

November

- MSVFD Turkey Shoot
- Salvation Army Community Dinner
- Victorian Christmas at Miramont

December

- Breakfast with Santa
- Santa at the Town Clock
- Salvation Army Community Dinner

=== Inns and hotels ===
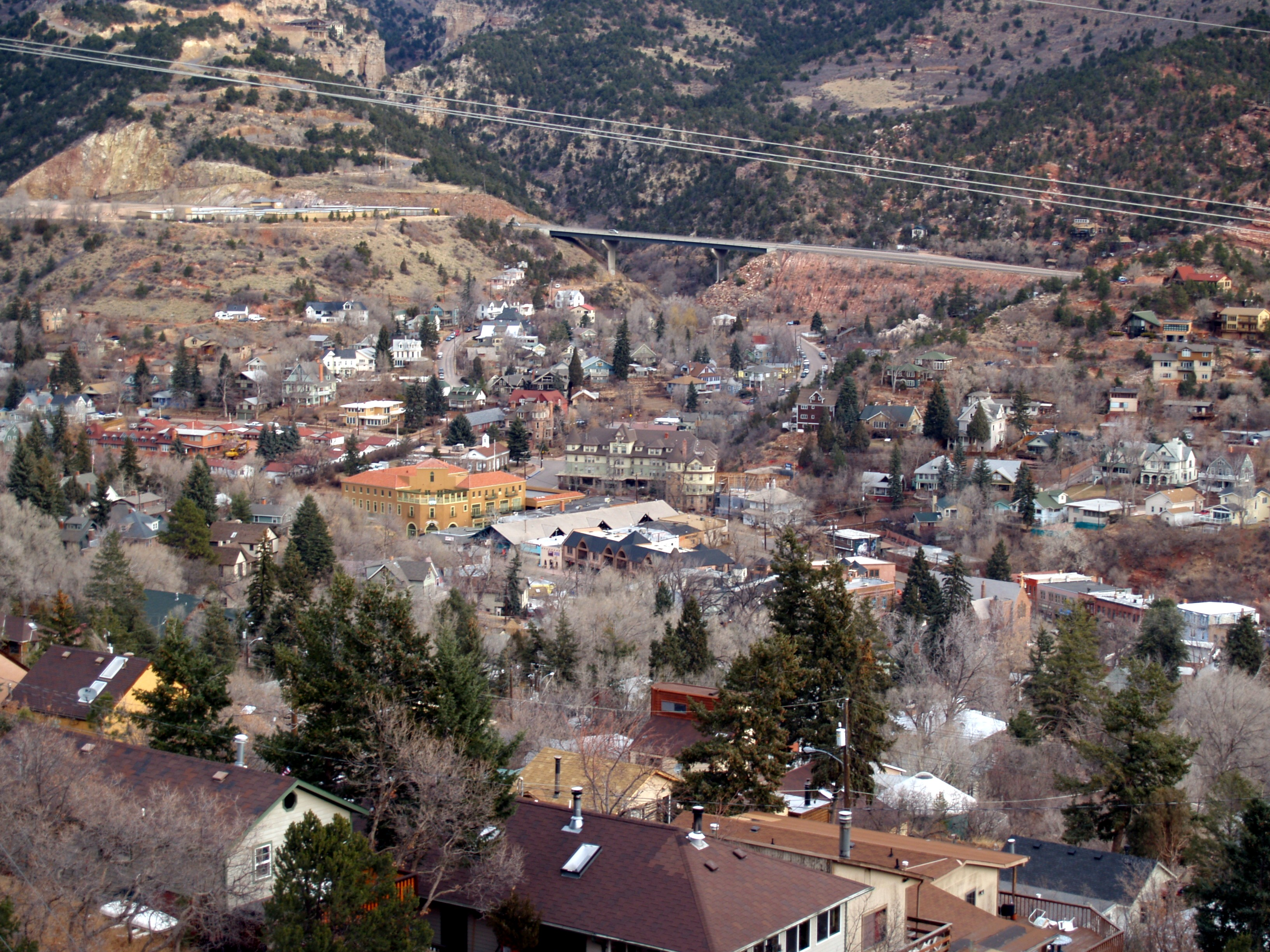
A view overlooking the city from the foothills

- Barker House, (a private Residential Apartment building for many decades) was one of the first hotels in Manitou Springs and due to its long history, Barker House is on the National Register of Historic Places.
- Briarhurst Manor, Victorian manor house built by the founder of Manitou Springs, Dr. William Bell
- Cliff House at Pikes Peak, a small luxury hotel and dining room, on the National Register of Historic Places

== Education ==
It is in the Manitou Springs School District 14.

== Notable people ==
- Justin Armour, NFL football player for the Buffalo Bills and Denver Broncos
- Matt Carpenter, athlete in the Pikes Peak Marathon.
- Atiba Jefferson, photographer
- Actors George Stults and Geoff Stults attended Manitou Springs High School.
- Clarence R. Wallace, Brigadier general, USMC; was born in Manitou Springs

== See also ==
- Manitou Springs Historic District
- Manitou and Pike's Peak Railway
