= Chipita Park, Colorado =

Unincorporated community in El Paso County, CO, USA

- unincorporated community
- Etymology: Chipeta - The wife of Chief Ouray
- This map shows the incorporated and unincorporated areas in El Paso County, Colorado, highlighting Cascade-Chipita Park in red.

- Location of Chipita Park, Colorado. Chipita Park (Colorado)
- Coordinates: 38°56′36″N 105°00′08″W
- Country: United States
- State: Colorado
- County: El Paso

Government
  - Type: unincorporated community
  - Body: El Paso County
- Elevation: 7,796 ft (2,376 m)
- Time zone: UTC−07:00 (MST)
  - Summer (DST): UTC−06:00 (MDT)
- ZIP code: 80809
- Area code: 719
- GNIS CDP ID: 2407982
- FIPS code: FIPS 08 12325

Chipita Park is an unincorporated community located in Cascade-Chipita Park, CO Census Defined Place, El Paso County, Colorado, United States. The ZIP Code of the Cascade, Colorado, post office is 80809. The town is named for the Chipeta, the wife of Chief Ouray. Chipita Park mailing addresses are served by the Cascade, Colorado, post office (ZIP code 80809).

== History ==
The Chipita Park, Colorado, post office operated from March 9, 1935, until May 31, 1967, when it was merged into the Cascade, Colorado, post office.

== Geography ==
Chipita Park, Colorado, is located 2.7 miles (4.3 km) northwest of Cascade at coordinates 38.9244°N 105.0066°W and elevation 7,796 feet (2,376 m).

== Demographics ==
See the Cascade-Chipita Park, CO Census Defined Place.

== See also ==
- Cascade-Chipita Park, CO Census Defined Place
