= Iron Springs, Colorado =

Neighborhood in Manitou Springs, Colorado

External images
- Image of Iron Springs, 1901
- Images of Manitou Incline and Iron Springs

Iron Springs, a neighborhood in Manitou Springs, Colorado, was an area named for one of Manitou Mineral Springs. The Manitou area had been frequented by Native Americans who considered it a sacred and healing place before European Americans settled in Manitou.

Iron Springs began to be visited in the 1870s, particularly the Ute Iron Springs. In 1880, a new Iron Springs Hotel was built. Attractions and businesses in Iron Springs included an electric trolley, mineral springs, the Manitou Incline, and the Manitou and Pike's Peak Railway, a cog railway. The incline was dismantled and is now a hiking trail. Neither the electric trolley or the Colorado Midland Railway are in Iron Springs now. The cog railway continues to operate. Iron Springs was annexed into Manitou Springs in several steps between 1887 and 1934.

== Geography ==
The Iron Springs neighborhood is located in lower Englemann Canyon, along Ruxton Creek. It is the site of trailheads to higher elevations, including the Paul Intemann Memorial Nature Trail and the Barr Trail.

== History ==
=== Mineral Springs ===
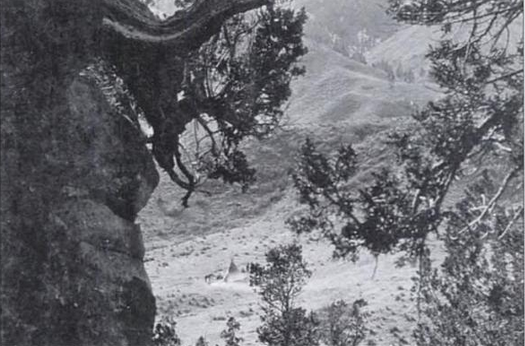
Valley of springs where Ute came to hunt and take the mineral springs. The center of the photograph shows a "lone encampment" of Ute Native Americans, between 1874 and 1879.

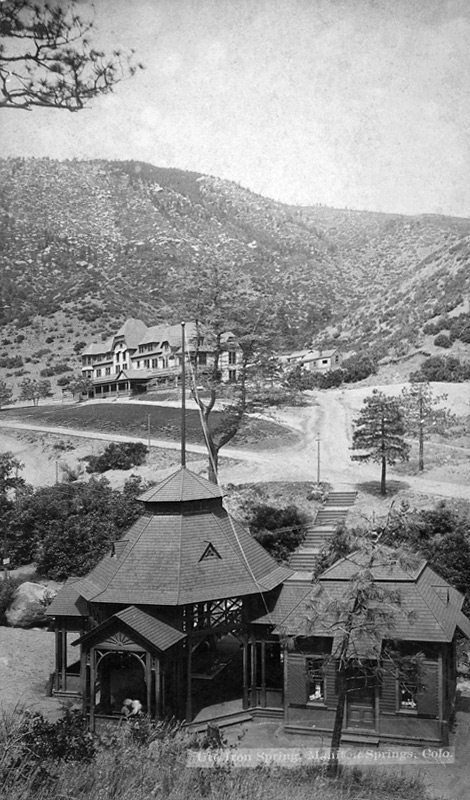
Ute Iron Spring, Gazebo and curio shoppe. Iron Springs Hotel in background. Photograph courtesy: Manitou Springs Heritage Center.

The Manitou Springs area has several mineral springs, called manitou for the "breath of the Great Spirit Manitou" believed to have created the bubbles, or "effervescence", in the spring water. The springs were considered sacred grounds where Native Americans drank and soaked in the mineral water to replenish and heal themselves. Ute, Arapaho, Cheyenne and other plains tribes came to the area, spent winters there, and "share[d] in the gifts of the waters without worry of conflict." There were 9 or 10 natural springs. As whites moved in there were "skirmishes" for access to the historical resort area until the Native Americans were removed from the area and placed on reservations.

Explorer Stephen Harriman Long made note of the water's healing properties in 1820. His expedition's botanist and geologist, Edwin James, noted the healing benefits of the water; He was also the first European man believed to have climbed Pikes Peak. George Frederick Ruxton wrote of the "boiling waters" in a book about his travels. Recognizing the extent to which Native Americans considered the site to be sacred, Ruxton wrote: "...the basin of the spring (at Manitou) was filled with beads and wampum, and pieces of red cloth and knives, while the surrounding trees were hung with strips of deer skin, cloth and moccosons (sic)."

In the 1870s, there was a pavilion over the Ute Iron Springs, which is thought to be one "strongest of tonics" due to its high iron content. In the early or mid 1880s, Iron Springs Company purchased the spring and built an Adirondack style wood pavilion over the spring. They sold the mineral water commercially until they sold the spring to Joseph G. Hiestand in 1887. In 1890, Joseph G. Heistand had the Ute Iron Springs pavilion torn down and rebuilt as a two-story structure, the second floor was a photographic gallery. The spring in the lower Englemann canyon was near the mouth of the canyon and the Iron Springs Hotel. The Ouray spring was found in 1895 and was established commercially that year.

In 1910, the Iron Geyser on Ruxton Avenue was drilled by Hiestand, to augment the operations of his Ute Iron spring. (Note: It is the only spring in Manitou Springs to have its original pavilion.) (Note: Near the depot there were three mineral springs in 1913: Ute-Iron, Little Chief, and Ouray springs. The Little Chief, known in 1887, was further away from Manitou along Ruxton Creek than the Ute Iron Spring. It had a highly sulphuric taste.) The springs were owned by Hiestand through his death on January 1, 1916. (Note: Hiestand owned the Summit House on top of Pike's Peak at the time of his death. He died January 1, 1916 while cleaning his guns in his room at the Iron Springs Hotel.) In the 1920s, William S. Crosby drilled two streams, which combined made a sweet tasting soda water, named Twin Springs.

The current Manitou Mineral Springs on Ruxton Avenue are Iron Spring and Twin Spring. Ute Iron Spring was capped when the Iron Springs Chateau Melodrama Dinner Theater was built in or before 1964.

=== Hotels ===
According to a June 1880 advertisement, the Iron Springs Hotel was located very near the Ute Iron Springs and has been entirely rebuilt and decorated with the "handsomest" furnishings. Charles A. Hubert was the proprietor of the hotel. It was burned in July 1882.

In 1884, the large Iron Springs Hotel was built by the Gillis Brothers for the Manitou Iron Springs Company. It was located on Ruxton Avenue at the site of the current Manitou Incline trailhead. The Gillis Brothers also had several cottages built on Ruxton that year. In 1885, the hotel began using a generator, installed by the Edison Incandescent Lighting Company. The power and lighting was tested at the hotel before working on the "lower part of Manitou". (Note: The Iron Springs Company installed the plant that was used by all lower Manitou (Iron Springs).) That year, the establishment could serve more than 200 people in its hotel and cottages, which had hot and cold running water and steam heat, in addition to electricity. H. T. Blake was the owner of the Iron Springs Hotel in 1887 and at least into 1888.

The hotel was purchased by Major John Hulbert, Jerome B. Wheeler, and M.A. Leddy by January 18, 1890, for about $150,000 equivalent to $5,375,000 in 2025). Their plans include increasing the hotel plant to a building costing $300,000 equivalent to $10,750,000 in 2025). Hiestand was the owner of the hotel by 1900 and at the time of his death in 1916. (Note: Located on Ruxton Avenue, the hotel was owned by the Ute Iron Springs Company by 1903. The second Iron Springs hotel burned down in 1907 and was replaced.)

The Eggleton offered furnished rooms near the Ute Iron Springs by 1903.

=== Railways ===
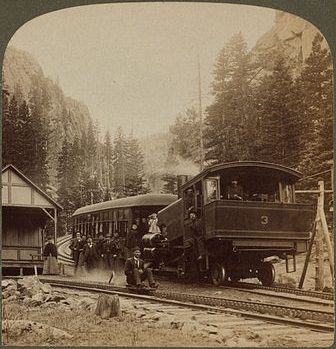
Manitou and Pike's Peak Railway depot on Ruxton Avenue, 1894

Construction of a Denver and Rio Grande Western Railroad spur from Colorado Springs to Manitou began in 1880.

In 1886 or 1887, the Colorado Midland Railway (Note: In 1888, Thomas Saunders was the superintendent of the Iron Springs Colorado Midland Railway station. By 1903, R. T. Dunaway was the agent of the Colorado Midland Depot on Pawnee Avenue at the railroad tracks.) operated along Ruxton Creek. The railway offered service between Manitou and Green Mountain Falls through Ute Pass. The route was extended to Leadville and Aspen. Colorado Midland Railway—founded by Irving Howbert, J. J. Hagerman, and Jerome B. Wheeler—helped to make resort communities in Ute Pass successful in the 1890s, but it did not realize great financial success.

In 1891, the Manitou & Pikes Peak Cog Railway had been built along Ruxton Creek and transported passengers to the Pikes Peak summit. The depot was built by the Gillis Brothers. Aside from the addition of a lunchroom, the depot has not changed much from its original building.

In 1895, the Colorado Springs and Interurban Railway electric trolley line provided transportation from Manitou Avenue to the Manitou and Pike's Peak Railway depot on Ruxton Avenue on a trolley called the "Dinky".

=== Historic buildings and attractions ===
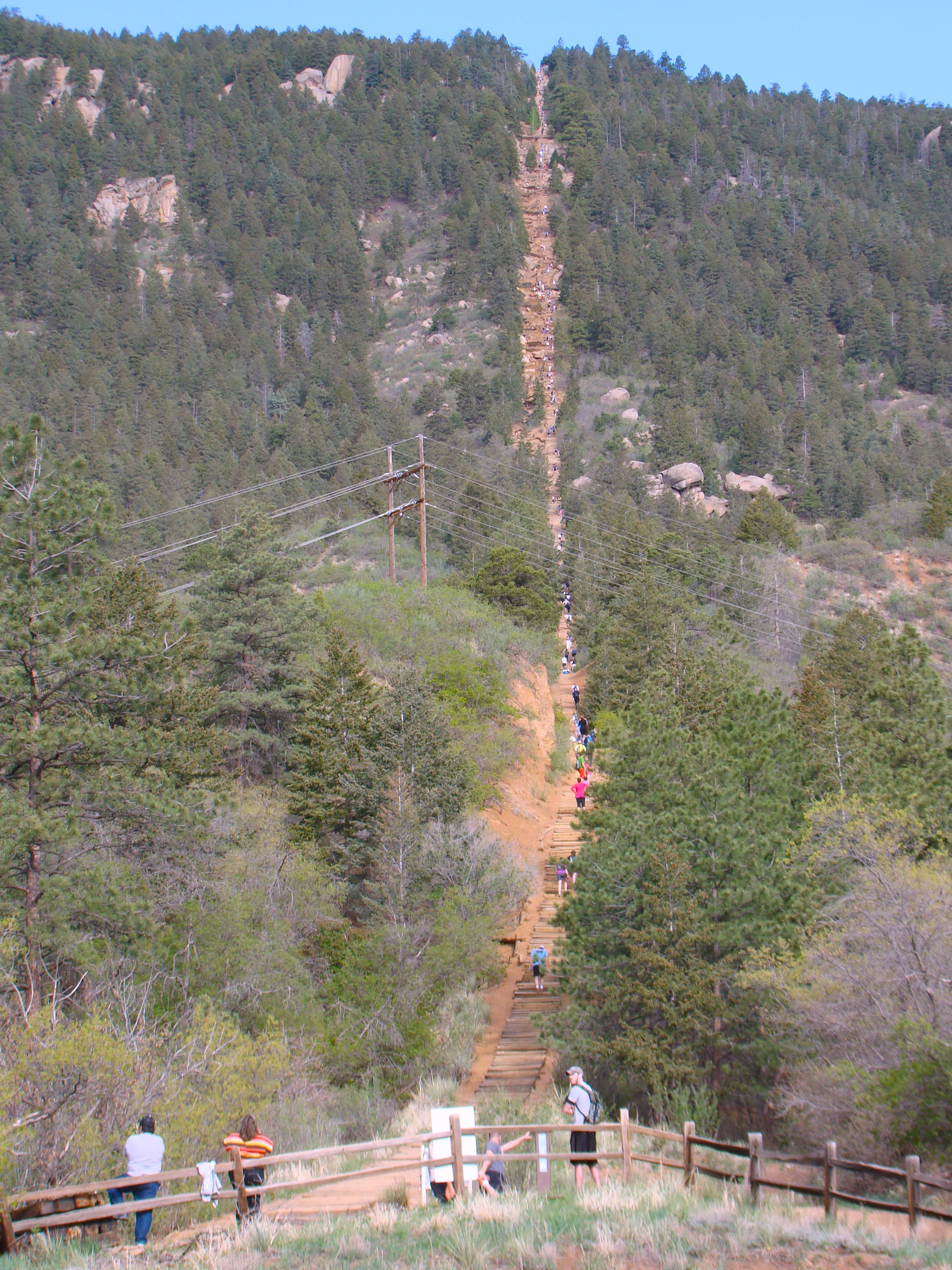
View of the Manitou Incline from the base, May 2013

In 1880, a candy and cigar store operated near the Ute Iron Spring. lt was purchased by the Iron Springs Company, who also bought the spring. Joseph G. Heistand collected and stored 40 tons of items, such as stones to be polished and petrified wood, for his store in 1890. The "avid collector of mineral specimens" operated a curio shop near the cog railway station. Days after his death in 1916, his stone collection was described as interesting and valuable. The Iron Springs Chateau Melodrama Theater was built over the capped Ute Iron Spring and began offering dinner theater entertainment in 1964 and continues to do so.

Hiestand and R.D. Weir leased the "new casino" near the Manitou and Pike's Peak Cog Railway depot and the Ute Iron Spring in 1895. They made extensive additions to the existing property, including adding a bowling alley, billiard rooms, dancing floor made of hard maple, and built an additional building. The two buildings were connected by an ornamental bridge on the second stories. It was extravagantly furnished.

A Hydro-Electric Plant was built in 1905 at 540 Ruxton Avenue. It has a formal, modern façade of red brick with two large arched windows with fanlights on the front of the building. The plant, now called the Manitou Hydroelectric plant, is one of two plants that generate electricity for the City of Colorado Springs from water that flows through the Ruxton Creek watershed. The other is the Ruxton Hydroelectric plant. After water has been processed by the hydroelectric plants, it flows to the Mesa water treatment plant.

The Manitou Incline was built in 1907 to support the Hydro-Electric Plant operations. Materials were transported uphill to build pipelines on Pikes Peak. When the construction project was completed, the trail was converted to a cable car attraction to take visitors to the top of Mount Manitou, where there was a picnic area and refreshment stand. In 1990, the track was damaged during a rock slide and the incline was closed and the rails removed. In 2013, it was opened as a one mile hiking trail, with a 2,000 feet (610 m) ascent.

Our Lady of Perpetual Help Catholic Church, located at 218 Ruxton Avenue, was built in 1889. The church was destroyed in a fire in 1903, and rebuilt within three months. The church is now a small Gothic and Shingle style church, with a greenstone bridge that crosses over Ruxton Creek.

=== Annexation ===
The road up Ruxton Creek (Ruxton Avenue) was annexed to Iron Springs in September 1880. Portions of Iron Springs were annexed to Manitou in February 1887, August 1893, and May 1934.
