= Ruxton Park =

Park in Manitou Springs, Colorado, US

Coordinates: 38°50′29.96″N 104°58′30.92″W

External images
- Ruxton Park, Mt. Baldy in the Distance, Pikes Peak Cog Road, Colorado
- A view of a Manitou and Pike's Peak Railway (the Pikes Peak Cog Road) locomotive and passenger car near Ruxton Park in El Paso County, Colorado. 1891

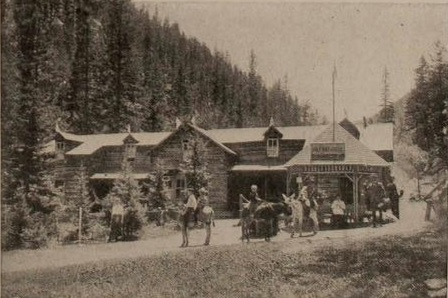
Halfway House, Ruxton Park, Colorado. The image was taken from Stop at Pike's Peak on your Way to or from the Expositions for the 1915 Panama–Pacific International Exposition.

Ruxton Park is a park in Manitou Springs, El Paso County, Colorado at 9,078 feet (2,767 m) in elevation. The Manitou and Pike's Peak Railway, which departs from the depot at 6,570 feet (2,000 m) in elevation, climbs into Englemann Canyon along Ruxton Creek. It passes by the site of the Halfway Hotel and then Ruxton Park at mile marker 3 on the 8.9 mile trip to Pikes Peak summit.

In the late 19th century and early 20th century, it was a small town established along Ruxton Creek near Iron Springs, Colorado (now Manitou Springs). Since 1925, it has been the site of a hydroelectric plant owned by the city of Colorado Springs and a weather station. Ruxton Park was only inhabited by a caretaker for the plant from 1930 to 2008, when the plant was fully automated.

== History ==
In 1884, Thomas Palsgrove and his family lived in a cabin that was on a trail to the summit of Pike's Peak. They provided coffee and doughnuts as refreshments for hikers. He then began expansion of the cabin along Ruxton Creek that eventually was the Halfway Hotel with 22 rooms and was run by John Palsgrove by 1903.

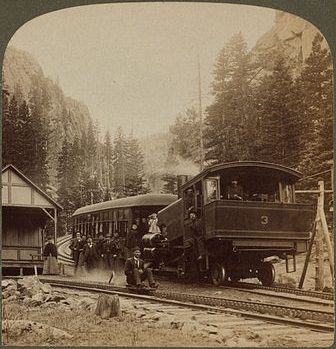
Manitou and Pike's Peak Railway depot on Ruxton Avenue, 1894, photograph by Robert N. Dennis

Thomas and his brothers developed the site and in 1890 platted the streets for a town named Ruxton Park below the timber line where Ruxton and Sheep Creeks meet. Cabins were built on several sold lots.

The Manitou and Pike's Peak Railway was built in 1890, which brought tourists to the top of Pike's Peak beginning June 30, 1891. The first third of the trip is alongside Ruxton Creek. A stop was made at Ruxton Park where tourists could eat a meal at the "pleasant" Halfway Hotel.

Halfway House, "far from half way to the summit,... is a rustic mountain hotel surrounded by a grove of stately pines, and towering above it, the pinnacled rocks of Hell[s] Gate, through whose portal the train then passes."

Ruxton Park was described as an area of aspen trees, pine trees and flowers—surrounded by Pike's Peak, Mt. Rosa, Cameron's Cone and other peaks. Wealthy families from the western states had houses in the town where they sought the cooler mountain temperatures during the summers. The town had a "fancy tourist hotel", water tower, and post office.

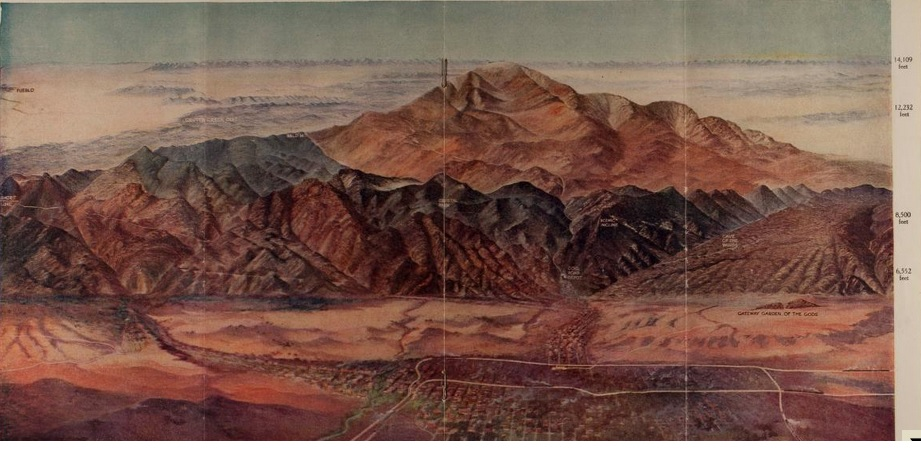
Pike's Peak mountain with Manitou Springs in the center foreground (Colorado Springs is in the lower foreground). The image was taken from Stop at Pike's Peak on your Way to or from the Expositions for the 1915 Panama–Pacific International Exposition. The cog railway depot 6,570 feet (2,000 m) was situated on Ruxton Avenue in Manitou Springs (center foreground), and Ruxton Park is directly above the town along Ruxton Creek at 9,078 feet (2,767 m).

== Hydroelectric facility ==
In November 1925, the city of Colorado Springs opened a water utility power plant in Ruxton Park, designated Municipal Plant No. 3, (Note: So named because the city's first two power plants were the Manitou Hydroelectric Plant and the Martin Drake Power Plant.) at a cost of US$16,866 (equivalent to $302,404 in 2024). Fed by a pipeline from Lake Moraine, the Ruxton facility channels water down to Manitou Springs and Colorado Springs, generating electricity as Ruxton Creek descends the mountain.

The plant was originally designed to be fully automated and remotely managed—an ambitious goal in the 1920s—due to its isolation, which required nearly a two-hour, 72-mile (116 km) drive from Colorado Springs over rough mountain roads, (Note: The trip (calculated at 69.6 miles on Google Maps) is made over Colorado Springs Water Department Roads, Forest Service Road 376 to Victor, through Cripple Creek and Woodland Park to Colorado Springs.) or a trip on the Cog Railway. Its valves were to be controlled from another plant in Manitou Springs, but the system never worked as intended.

In 1930, Colorado Springs Utilities began stationing caretakers at the site to oversee operations during the 6-month summer operating season. The caretaker's house, a simple white structure a few hundred feet from the plant, opened that same year. From 1930 to 2008, nine Utilities employees took on the challenge of living in Ruxton Park, operating the plant and taking measurements for the National Weather Service.

Rated for up to 1 megawatt, (Note: In 1957, it generated up to 1,250 kilowatts and the Manitou Hydroelectric Plant produced up to 5,000 kilowatts. The two plants supplied up to 4% of the Pikes Peak Region's electricity. The majority of the region's electricity was supplied by two steam plants in Colorado Springs. When the water levels rise, though, the plants can supply more electricity. During the Memorial Day 1935 flood, the two plants supplied electricity for two weeks to the Pikes Peak region.) the Ruxton plant is relatively small, but it has remained in operation because of its key position in the city's water network. The facility connects reservoirs on the South Slope to the water systems serving Manitou Springs and Colorado Springs, where water pressure must be reduced before reaching distribution centers. The plant performs this function while also generating a modest amount of power.

In 2008, the plant was fully automated, ending the need for a resident caretaker, although city employees still occasionally stay in the house while performing maintenance due to the site's difficult access.
