= Ruxton Creek =

Stream in Manitou Springs, Colorado, US

Coordinates: 38°50′39″N 104°58′16.44″W

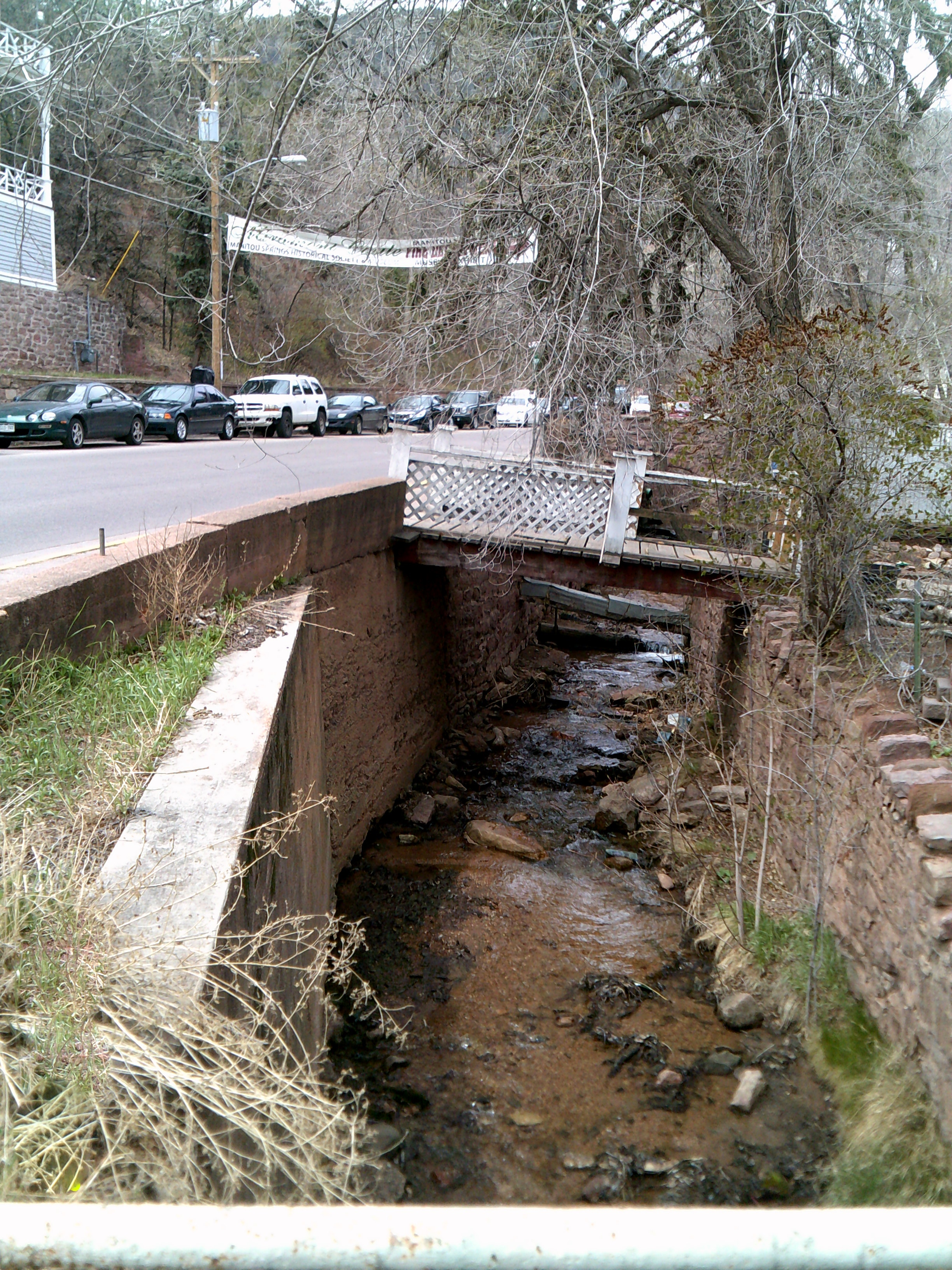
Ruxton Creek along Ruxton Avenue, Manitou Springs

Ruxton Creek is a stream in Manitou Springs in El Paso County, Colorado. Named for British explorer and writer of the southwest, George Fredrick Augustus Ruxton, it is one of three main drainage basins in Manitou Springs. Ruxton Creek flows out of Englemann Canyon and into the town of Manitou Springs. Iron Springs geyser emanates from the creek and is one of the Manitou Mineral Springs.

== Ruxton Creek Watershed ==
Ruxton Creek is located in the Arkansas River Watershed on the south slope of Pikes Peak. It is fed by the following bodies of water, which supply water for the Colorado Springs region and are also used by the Ruxton and Manitou hydroelectric plants to create electricity for the Pikes Peak region. The two plants combined can generate six megawatts of electricity.

Ruxton Creek Watershed
Fed by	Hydroelectric plant
Middle Beaver Creek	Ruxton plant
Lake Moraine	Ruxton plant (Note: Water can be diverted to the Big Tooth Reservoir and then flows to the Manitou plant, having been diverted from flowing to the Ruxton plant.)
Lion Creek	Ruxton plant
Sheep Creek	Ruxton plant
Willow Creek, via Big Tooth Reservoir	Manitou plant
South Ruxton Creek, via Big Tooth Reservoir	Manitou plant
Cabin Creek	Manitou plant

Lake Moraine reservoir was completed in 1891 and has a 431,000,000 gallon capacity. Big Tooth Reservoir was completed in 1929 and holds up to 90,300,000 gallons. Water from Pikes Peak's south slope was the first major water source for the city of Colorado Springs. (Note: Before Colorado Springs developed a water system, people obtained water from open ditches or wells, which became contaminated due to the porous, loose soil and residents became ill with typhoid fever. A gravity water system was built in 1878 to carry water from Pike Peak's Lake Moraine via Ruxton Creek.)

After water that has flowed through Ruxton Creek has been processed by the hydroelectric plants, it flows to the Mesa water treatment plant. Water left in or diverted to Ruxton Creek flows to Fountain Creek.

== History ==
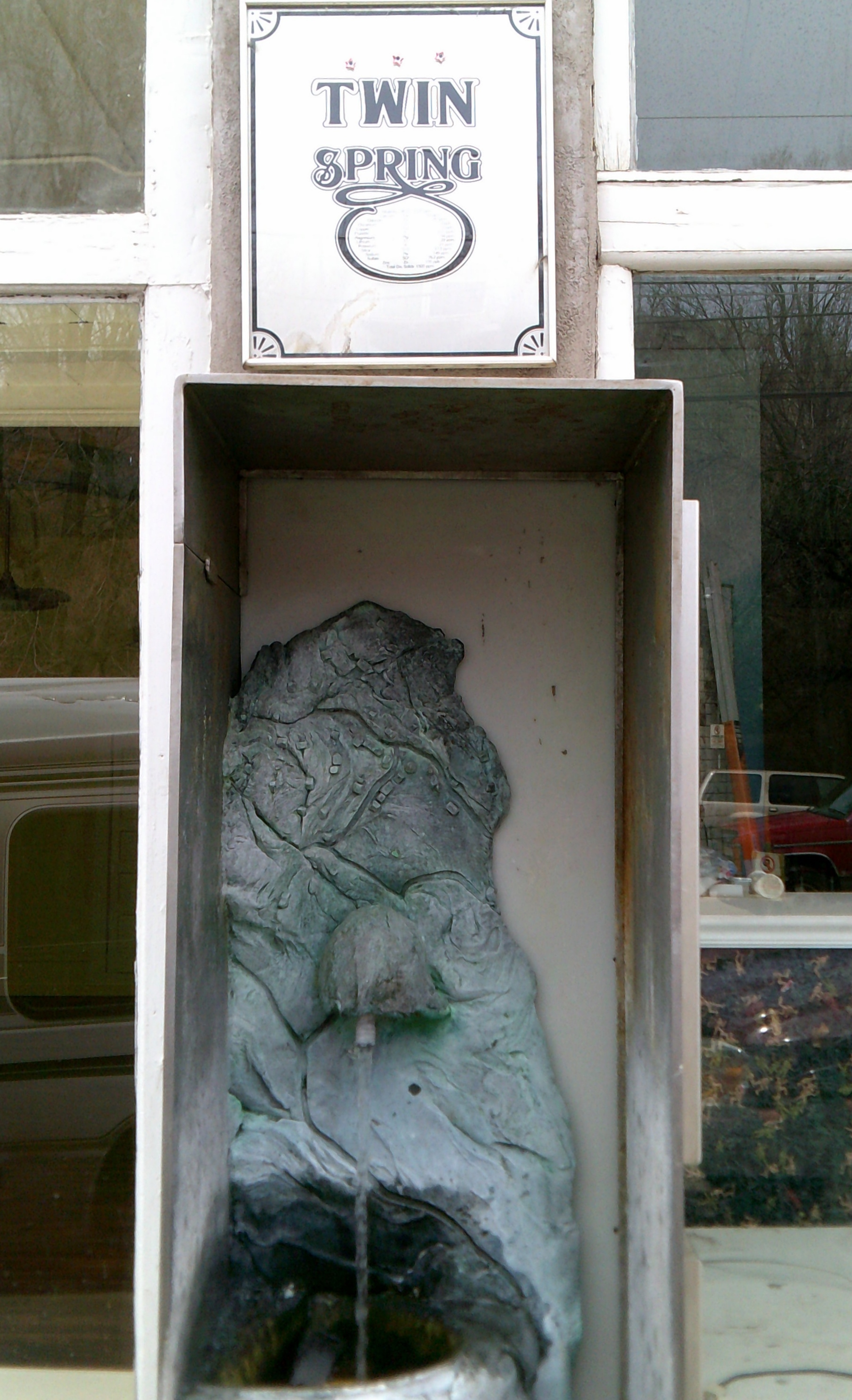
Twin Spring, Ruxton Avenue, Manitou Springs

In 1891, the Manitou & Pikes Peak Cog Railway had been built along Ruxton Creek and transported passengers to the Pikes Peak summit. Four years later an electric trolley line provided transportation from Manitou Avenue to the railway depot. The Colorado Midland Railway also operated along Ruxton Creek beginning in 1886.

Joseph G. Heistand opened the Iron Springs Hotel near the Ute Iron Spring, a pavilion and curio shop between the mid 1880s and 1900. He drilled the Iron Springs Geyser in 1910. It is thought to be one "strongest of tonics" for its high iron content.

== See also ==
- List of rivers of Colorado
