= Iron Springs =

Iron Springs may refer to:

- Iron Springs, Alberta, Canada
- Iron Springs, Arizona, an unincorporated community in central Yavapai County, Arizona, U.S.
- Iron Springs (Cochise County, Arizona), a natural spring
- Iron Springs, Colorado, a neighborhood of Manitou Springs, Colorado, U.S.
- Iron Springs, Pennsylvania, a community in Adams County, Pennsylvania, U.S.
- Iron Springs District, Utah, U.S.
- Iron Springs (Iron County, Utah), a former town site, named for nearby springs.
