= Jacob Schueler =

German businessman (1835–1918)

- Born: Jacob Schüler; August 15, 1834; Electoral Palatine District of Billigheiim, German Empire
- Died: April 15, 1918 (aged 82); Colorado Springs, Colorado, U.S.
- Resting place: Riverside Cemetery
- Occupations: Businessman; baker; confectioner
- Years active: 1862 - 1918
- Known for: Co-founding and being the lead investor in Coors Brewing Company
- Spouse: Stephanie Vinot (m. 1867; died 1918)
- Children: 5

Jacob Schueler (August 15, 1834 - April 15, 1918) was a German-American businessman and confectionary owner, best known for co-founding the Golden Brewery, today known as Coors Brewing Company in 1873.

== Early life and education ==
Jacob Schueler was born on August 15, 1834 in Rohrbach, Bavaria, to Friedrick and Katharina (née Herancourt) Schüler. His father owned and operated a mill. He immigrated to the United States in 1850 with the trade of baker.

== Career ==
He arrived in Denver, Colorado as one of the Pikes Peakers in 1861. He soon went to serve in the American Civil War and returned. During his war service, as a Bugler with the 3rd Colorado Volunteers, Schueler was present at the Sand Creek Massacre where he personally witnessed one of its atrocities of two very small children being killed simultaneously, which traumatized him the rest of his life. In 1862, he partnered with Adolph Schinner, a fellow German immigrant, establishing one of Denver's oldest confectionary/bakery. He continued to run this business until 1875.

In 1873, he teamed with fellow German immigrant Adolph Coors, investing $18,000 to Coors $2000, to start the Golden Brewery (initially operating as Schueler & Coors), now known as Coors Brewery, at Golden, Colorado. In 1880, Coors had made enough money to repay his partner's interest, and Schueler sold out to him. Schueler then went into business making soda under his own name, remaining well connected with and popular in Golden in supplying (and cornering with the willing community) its soda market there. In 1887-1888 Schueler reconnected with Coors in having Coors' Colorado Glass Works in Golden manufacture his bottles, after which the glass plant ceased operation and Schueler left the soda business. In 1889, Schueler went into business with Morris Stackder in Aspen, building the Schueler-Stackder Concentrating mill. In 1897, Schueler became famous for Rocky Mountain spring water in his own right, running the Ute Chief Mineral Springs bottling works at Manitou Springs, Colorado by the early 20th Century. After a great fire that burnt the bottling plant, the business was never the same. He continued to work for this company until his death.

== Family ==
Schueler married Stephanie Fannie Vinot (1845-1926), who was born in Villafans in the Franche-Comté region of France, and emigrated to the US with her parents as a child, in 1867. They had five children;

- Augustine (1870 - February 10, 1951)
- Rudolph (1872 - December 26, 1952)
- William (1875 - June 23, 1959)
- Frederick Fred (1886 - August 1960)

Jacob Schueler died in Colorado Springs in 1918, and is buried at Denver's Riverside Cemetery. Most of the Schueler family was laid to rest in a Denver cemetery, however Fred is buried with his wife Else (Wright) Schueler in Colorado Springs. There is only one descendant from the family, David Haskin (b. 1949), who resides in Denver, Colorado and is the Chief of Rampart Research & Rescue in Adams County, Colorado.

== Literature ==
- Janet Jewell; Returned From Oblivion - The Story of Jacob Schueler; 2013

== See also ==
- Manitou Mineral Springs
