= Englemann Canyon =

Valley in Colorado, U.S.

Coordinates: 38°50′54″N 104°57′42″W

External images
- View of Manitou Springs and Englemann Canyon (background), Denver Public Library Digital Collections
- Artist Glen, Englemann Canyon, Denver Public Library Digital Collections
- Minnehaha Falls, Denver Public Library Digital Collections
- Colorado Midland Railroad iron viaduct across Englemann Canyon, Denver Public Library Digital Collections
- Ute Iron Spring, Denver Public Library Digital Collections
- Pikes Peak Cog Road, Denver Public Library Digital Collections

Englemann Canyon (also spelled Engleman's Canon) is a valley along Ruxton Creek, in Manitou Springs, El Paso County, Colorado. It is one of three canyons in Manitou Springs, the others are Ute Pass and Williams Canyon.

== Upper Englemann Canyon ==
In 1880, a trail was opened in Englemann Canyon to Pikes Peak. It was called the Manitou Trail in 1883. Zalmon Simmons surveyed the canyon for telegraph lines. The Civil War veteran and later inventor of the Simmons mattress decided that the canyon was suited for construction of a cog railway. The Manitou and Pike's Peak Railway, built by Simmons and completed in 1890, begins in Englemann Canyon and follows Ruxton Creek up into the Rocky Mountains for Pikes Peak. The railroad climbs at an average 16% grade through the canyon past "stately spruces and jagged rocks". The first third of the 8.9 miles (14.3 km) railway trip is through Englemann Canyon, alongside Ruxton Creek. Scenery includes large boulders, Ponderosa pine trees, Engelmann spruce, and Colorado blue spruce. Sights in the canyon include Artist's Glen, Minnehaha Falls, Son-of-a-Gun Hill, Hells Gate, the site of Halfway House, and Ruxton Park. The Halfway House was the 22-room bed and breakfast along Ruxton Creek. Some of its guests were delivered by burros via a Pikes Peak burro trail. The accommodations became less desirable when the cog railway was built about 30 feet from the house. The Halfway House was a rustic hotel that served tourists who took the railway. Minnehaha, named for its falls, was a hamlet with several cabins.

In 1891, the canyon was described in The Illustrated American as "a narrow valley, with a steep mountain rising on either side, and the clear, sparkling Ruxton Creek rushing parallel to the track, sometimes dashing over rocks hundreds of feet below the train, and sometimes pausing for a moment to form a deep, smooth pool, such as the speckled trout loves to haunt."

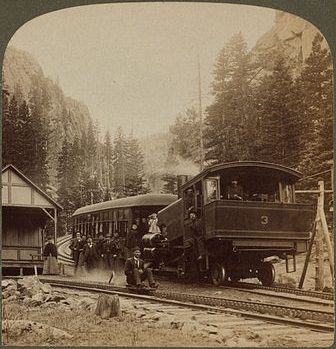
Manitou and Pike's Peak Railway depot on Ruxton Avenue, 1894

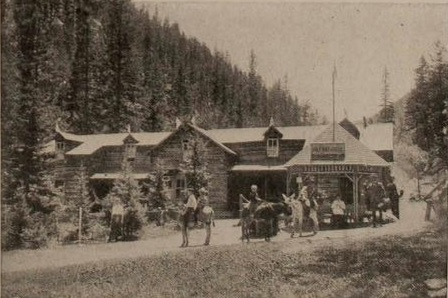
Halfway House, Ruxton Park, Colorado, by 1915

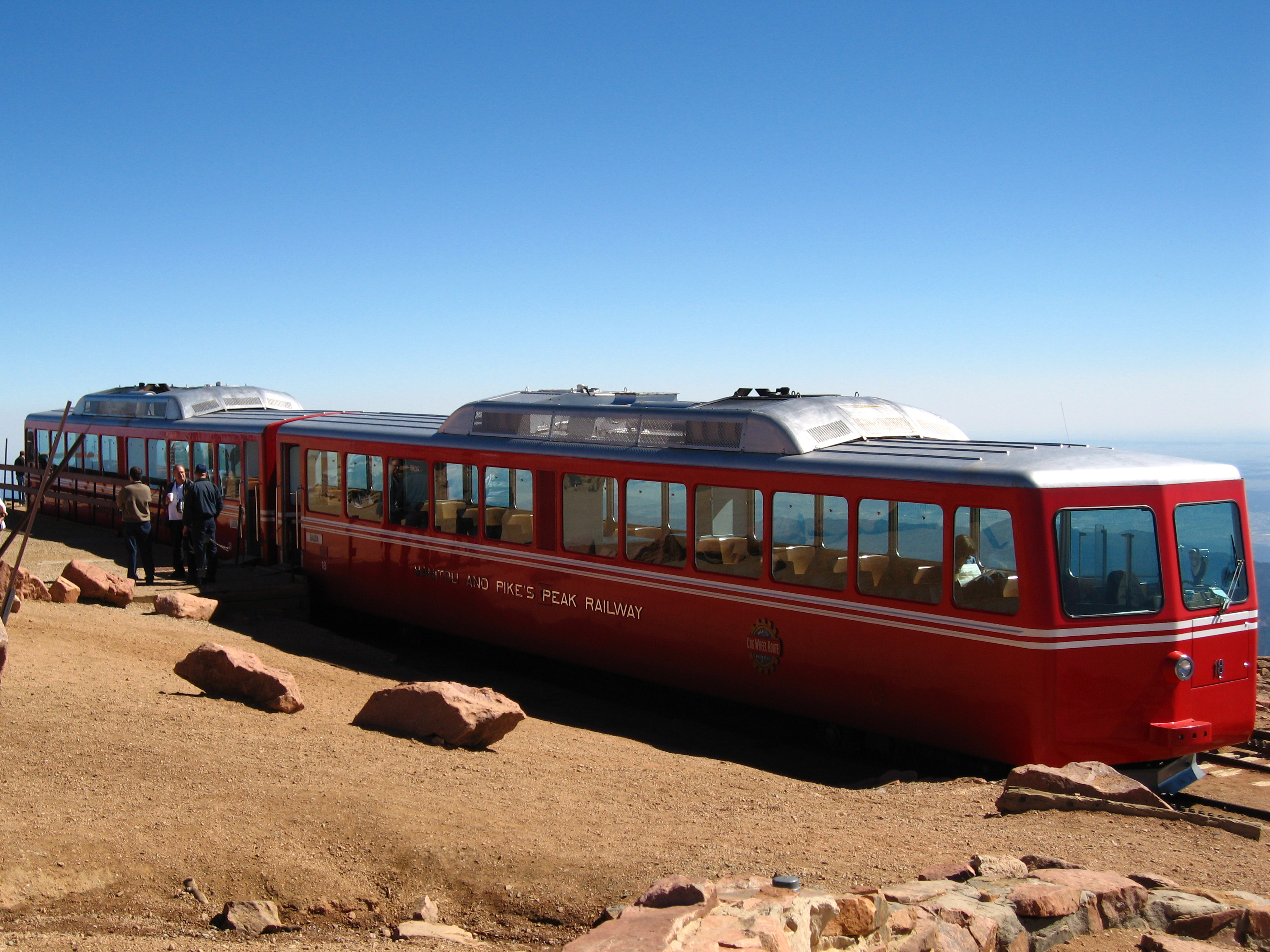
Manitou and Pike's Peak Railway, 2006

In 1925, a water utility power plant was built in Ruxton Park for $16,866 equivalent to $302,404 in 2024 by the city of Colorado Springs. The stone hydroelectric plant generates electricity as Ruxton Creek flows into Manitou Springs from the mountain. (Note: In 1957, it generated up to 1,250 kilowatts and the Manitou Hydroelectric Plant produced up to 5,000 kilowatts. The two plants supplied up to 4% of the Pikes Peak Region's electricity. The majority of the region's electricity was supplied by two steam plants in Colorado Springs. When the water levels rise, though, the plants can supply more electricity. During the Memorial Day 1935 flood, the two plants supplied electricity for two weeks to the Pikes Peak region.)

== Lower Englemann Canyon ==
In the early 20th century, an electric trolley of the Colorado Springs and Interurban Railway from Colorado Springs terminated at Manitou Springs, and a trolley, called the "Dinky" carried passengers up lower Englemann Canyon (Ruxton Road) to the Manitou and Pike's Peak Railway depot.

In 1891 the canyon had one spring, the Ute-Iron spring, Near the depot there were three mineral springs in 1913: Ute-Iron, Little Chief, and Ouray springs. near the Iron Springs Hotel. The current Manitou Mineral Springs on Ruxton Avenue are Iron Spring and Twin Spring.
