= Villafans =

- Commune
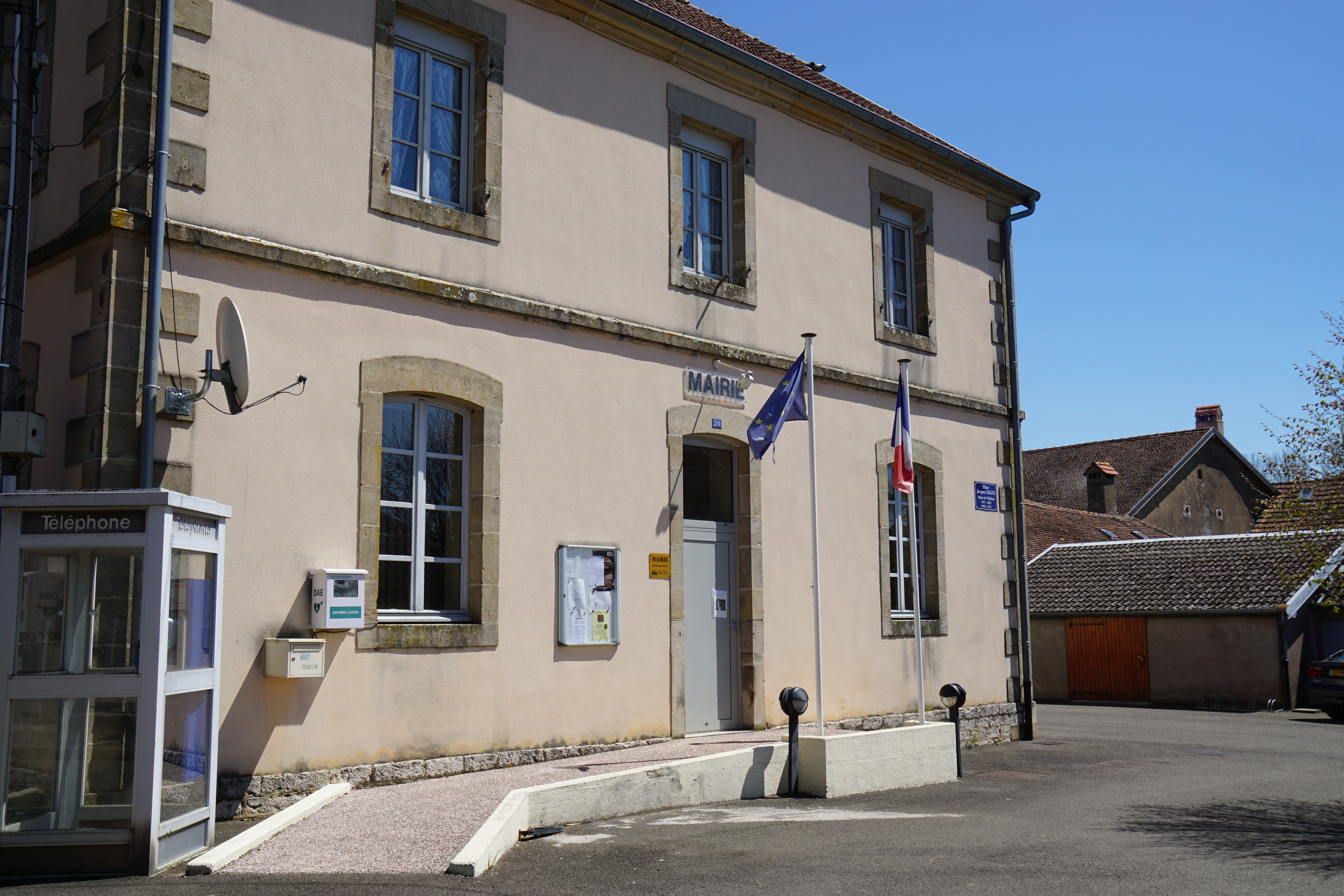
- The town hall in Villafans
- Location of Villafans
- Location within France Location within Bourgogne-Franche-Comté
- Coordinates: 47°34′55″N 6°28′21″E
- Country: France
- Region: Bourgogne-Franche-Comté
- Department: Haute-Saône
- Arrondissement: Lure
- Canton: Villersexel
- Area^{1}: 6.44 km^{2} (2.49 sq mi)
- Highest elevation: 361 m (1,184 ft)
- Lowest elevation: 263 m (863 ft)
- Population (2023): 195
  - Density: 30.3/km^{2} (78.4/sq mi)
- Time zone: UTC+01:00 (CET)
  - Summer (DST): UTC+02:00 (CEST)
- INSEE/Postal code: 70552 /70110
- ^{1} French Land Register data, which excludes lakes, ponds, glaciers > 1 km^{2} (0.386 sq mi or 247 acres) and river estuaries.

Villafans is a commune in the Haute-Saône department in the region of Bourgogne-Franche-Comté in eastern France.

Coal mines were operated in the village between 1828 and 1916.

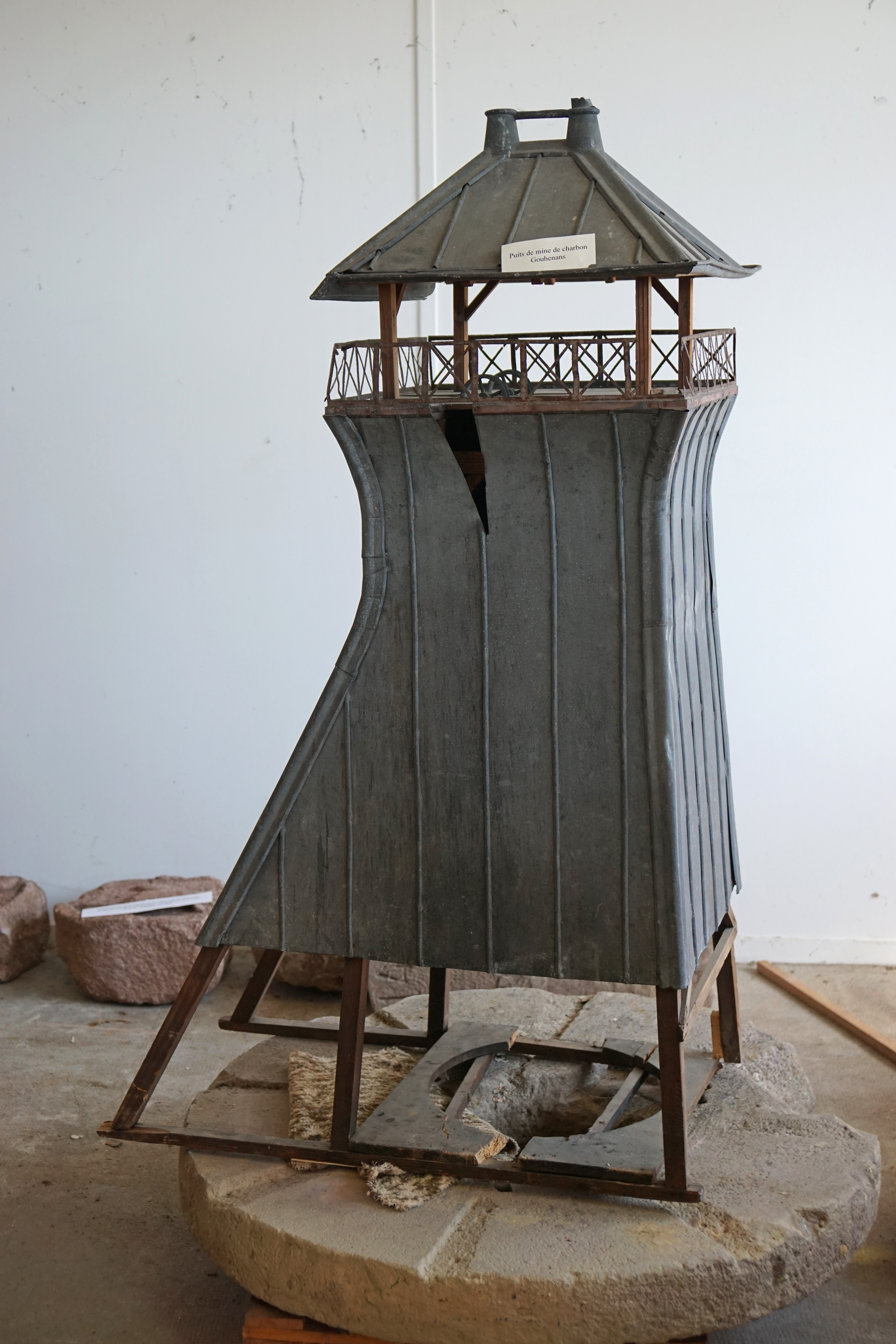
Mine shaft headframe 15 model.

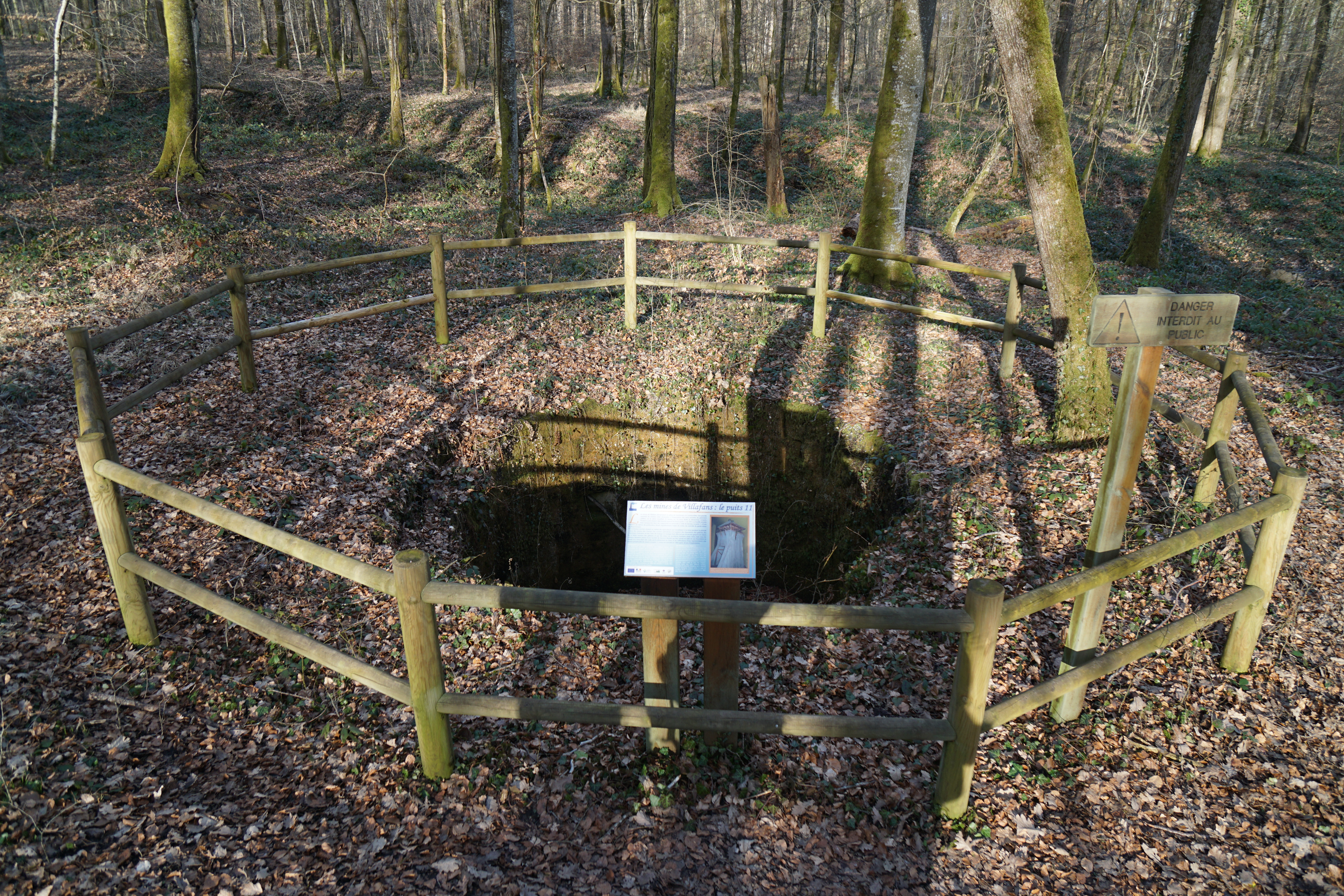
Mine shaft 15 site.

== See also ==
- Communes of the Haute-Saône department
- Coal mines and saltworks of Gouhenans
