= George Ruxton =

British botanist, geologist and explorer

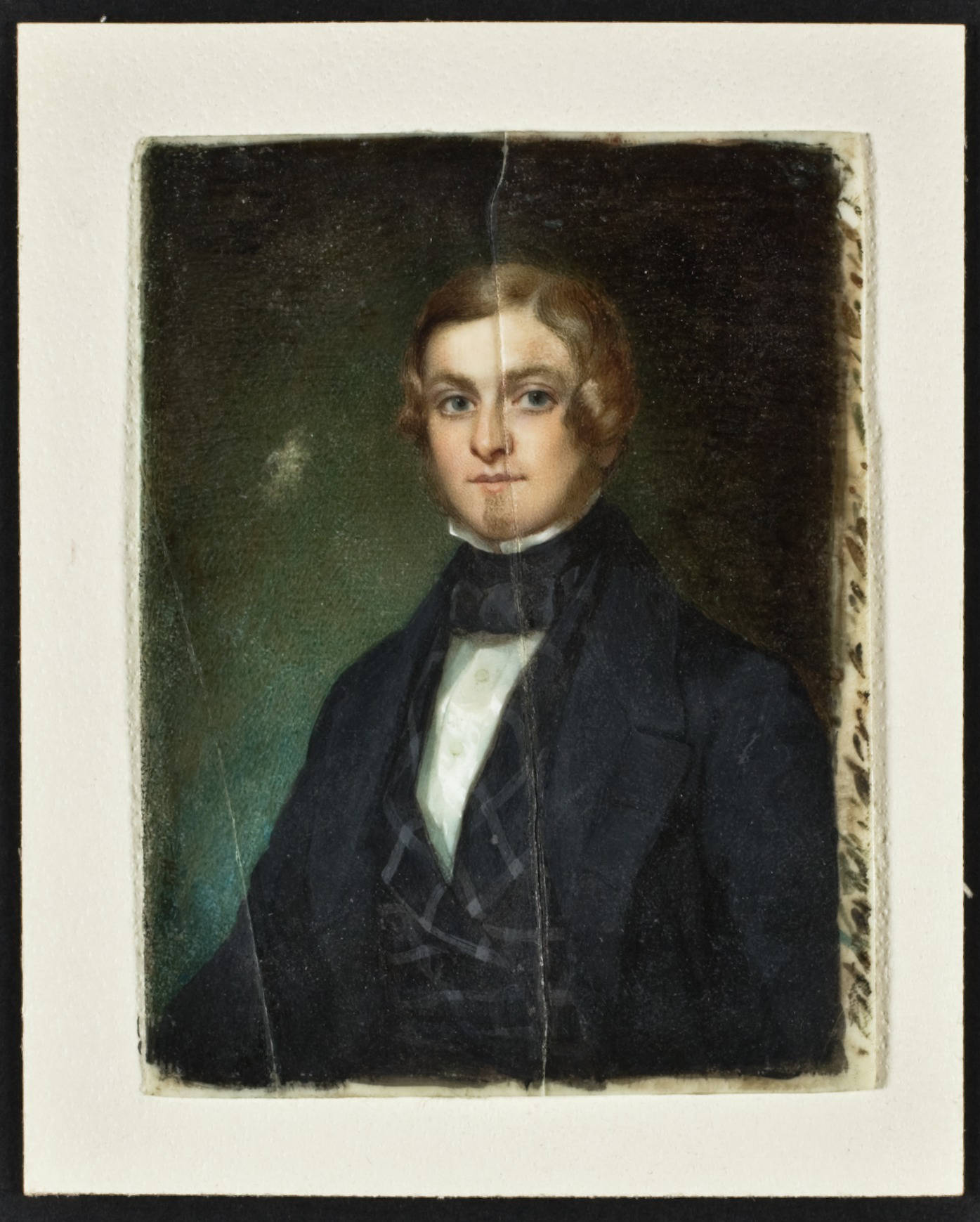
Miniature portrait of George Frederick Augustus Ruxton, ca. 1840s

George Frederick Ruxton (24 July 1821 – 29 August 1848) was a British explorer and travel writer. He was a lieutenant in the British Army, received a medal for gallantry from Queen Isabella II of Spain, was a hunter and explorer and published papers and books about his travels to Africa, Canada, Mexico and the United States.

He observed the westward expansion of the United States in the 1840s during the period when the country's government was pursuing its policy of manifest destiny. He was the first author to write "extensively" of the mountain men of the Rocky Mountains.

== Early life ==
George Frederick Augustus Ruxton, or George Augustus Frederick Ruxton, was born to Anna Maria Hay Ruxton and John Ruxton, Esquire near Oxfordshire, England. His maternal grandfather was Colonel Patrick Hay, a descendant of the house of Tweeddales. Ruxton attended Turnbridge School and began his education at Royal Military Academy Sandhurst, but left before receiving his commission.

He had an adventuresome spirit: "I was a vagabond in all my propensities. Everything quiet or commonplace I detested and my spirit chafed within me to see the world and participate in scenes of novelty and danger."

== Spain ==
He was a soldier during a Spanish Civil War, 1833–39 at the age of 17. He became a lancer under Diego de León and received the Laureate Cross of Saint Ferdinand from Queen Isabella II for his gallantry at Belascoáin.

== North America ==
He then served in the 89th (The Princess Victoria's) Regiment of Foot in Canada. Intrigued by the lives of Native Americans and trappers on the open prairie, Ruxton relinquished his lieutenant commission in the British Army and became a hunter in Upper Canada.

== Africa ==
After returning to England, Ruxton set sail from Liverpool to explore central Africa. He was unsuccessful in obtaining the information and resources needed to explore as he wished and returned to England, but over the years yearned to return to Africa once more. He wrote a paper of African bushmen, who have been driven since Dutch occupation in 1652 "from desert to desert, 'their hand raised against every man, and every man's against them.'" On 26 November 1845, he presented his paper to the Ethnological Society of London.

== Mexico and the American Far West ==
In 1846 Ruxton set sail for Veracruz, Mexico to observe the Mexican–American War. From there, he traveled north to Santa Fe, presently in the state of New Mexico. Ruxton visited Bent's Fort as he traveled to the current state of Colorado.

From January through May, 1847 (Ruxton, 1848) hunted along the front range of Colorado, visited with mountain men and endured an extremely cold winter while mostly in the company of his horse Panchito and two mules that he had acquired earlier in Mexico. Sites he visited include Ute Pass, "Woodland Park, Florissant, [and] Lake George".

He spent time observing the relationships between the U.S. Army and the Comanche Indians. After working as a mountain man in the Rocky Mountains, about which he wrote the book Ruxton of the Rockies, he then moved to St. Louis.

He wrote articles named Life in the Far West for Blackwood's Magazine, using the pen name "La Bonté". In it, he wrote "extensively" of the healing benefits of the mineral waters found in the west, such as Manitou Springs mineral water.

He wrote of his experiences in the Far West:

I must confess that the very happiest moments of my life have been spent in the wilderness of the Far West; and I never recall, but with pleasure, the remembrance of my solitary camp in the Bayou Salade [Salt valley of South Park, Colorado], with no friend near me more faithful than my rifle, and no companions more sociable than my good horse and mules, or the attendant cayute which nightly serenaded us. With a plentiful supply of dry pine-logs on the fire, and its cheerful blaze streaming far up into the sky, illuminating the valley far and near, and, pipe in mouth, watch the blue smoke as it curled upwards, building castles in the vapoury wreaths, and, in the fantastic shapes it assumed, peopling the solitude with figures of those far away ... I believe not one instance could be adduced of even the most polished and civilised of men, who had once tasted the sweets of its attendant liberty, and freedom from every worldly care, not regretting the moment when he exchanged it for the monotonous life of the settlements, nor sighing and sighing again once more to partake of its pleasures and allurements.

He died at the age of 27 of epidemic dysentery in St. Louis, Missouri in 1848. Prior to that he had been bedridden from a fall that occurred in the Rocky Mountains.

== Publications ==
Ruxton's works included autobiographical and fictional accounts.

- Adventures in Mexico and the Rocky Mountains. Harper and Brothers. 1848.
- Adventures in Mexico and the Rocky Mountains (reprint). J. Murray. 1861.
- In the old West (reprint). International Fiction Library. 1915.
- Life in the Far West (reprint). W. Blackwood and sons. 1851. ISBN 9780598286062.
- Mountain men: George Frederick Ruxton's first hand account of fur trappers and Indians in the Rockies (reprint). Holiday House. 1966.
- Wild Life in the Rocky Mountains (reprint). BiblioBazaar. September 2010. ISBN 978-1-171-67077-3.
