= Pikes Peak Cog Railway =

Tourist cog railway to Pike's Peak, Colorado

Coordinates: 38°51′22″N 104°55′53″W

The Broadmoor Manitou and Pikes Peak Cog Railway

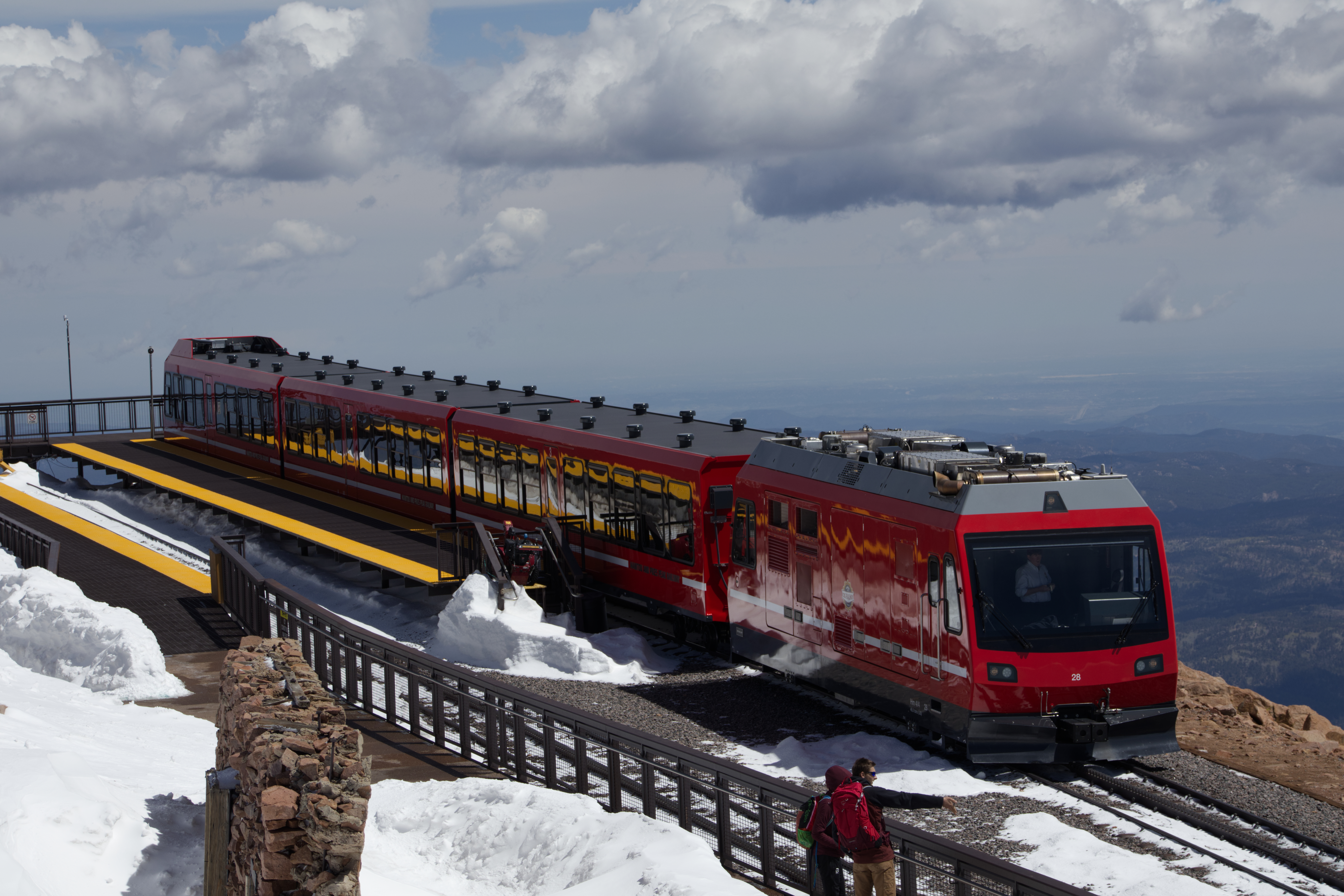
- Train stopped at the summit of Pikes Peak

Overview
- Locale: Pikes Peak
- Stations: 2
- Website: cograilway.com

History
- Opened: 1890; 136 years ago

Technical
- Line length: 8.9 mi (14.3 km)
- Rack system: Abt (until 2017), Strub (after 2021)
- Track gauge: 4 ft 8 1/2 in (1,435 mm) standard gauge
- Highest elevation: 14,115 ft (4,302 m)

The Broadmoor Manitou and Pikes Peak Cog Railway (also known as the Pikes Peak Cog Railway) is a cog railway that climbs one of the most iconic mountains in the United States, Pikes Peak in Colorado. The base station is in Manitou Springs, near Colorado Springs.

Construction on the line was started in 1889 and the first train reached the summit on June 30, 1891. Cog railways are common in Switzerland and found in other parts of the world (totaling about 50 lines), but this is one of only three such lines remaining in the United States, the others being the older Mount Washington Cog Railway in New Hampshire, and the short Quincy and Torch Lake Cog Railway.

Originally powered by steam locomotives, the line later switched over to diesel-powered locomotives and self-propelled railcars. The railway was closed between October 29, 2017 and May 20, 2021, for a complete refurbishment that saw the replacement of the track infrastructure, the rebuild of older railcars and the purchase of three new trainsets.

== History ==
=== Steam Era ===
The idea for the railroad came in 1888, after a trip to the summit by inventor Zalmon G. Simmons, who had founded previously the Simmons Bedding Company. Simmons had designed a wooden telegraph insulator while on the board of directors of Western Union, and was surveying Englemann Canyon for telegraph lines to the top of Pikes Peak. It was a miserable two-day trip on a mule and after his return, Simmons was convinced that there needed to be a more "civilized" mode of travel to the summit of Pikes Peak and decided to fund the construction of a railway.

The line would start at a depot in the town of Manitou Springs, located at an elevation of 6,320 feet (1,930 m), and climb 8.9 miles (14.3 km) to the summit of Pikes Peak at an elevation of 14,115 feet (4,302 m). The average grade of the line would be 12% but would top out at 25%. Normal trains can not retain traction on the rails at grades steeper than 10%, so the railway would need to use a cog and rack system to help pull trains up the mountain and control the speed of the descent.

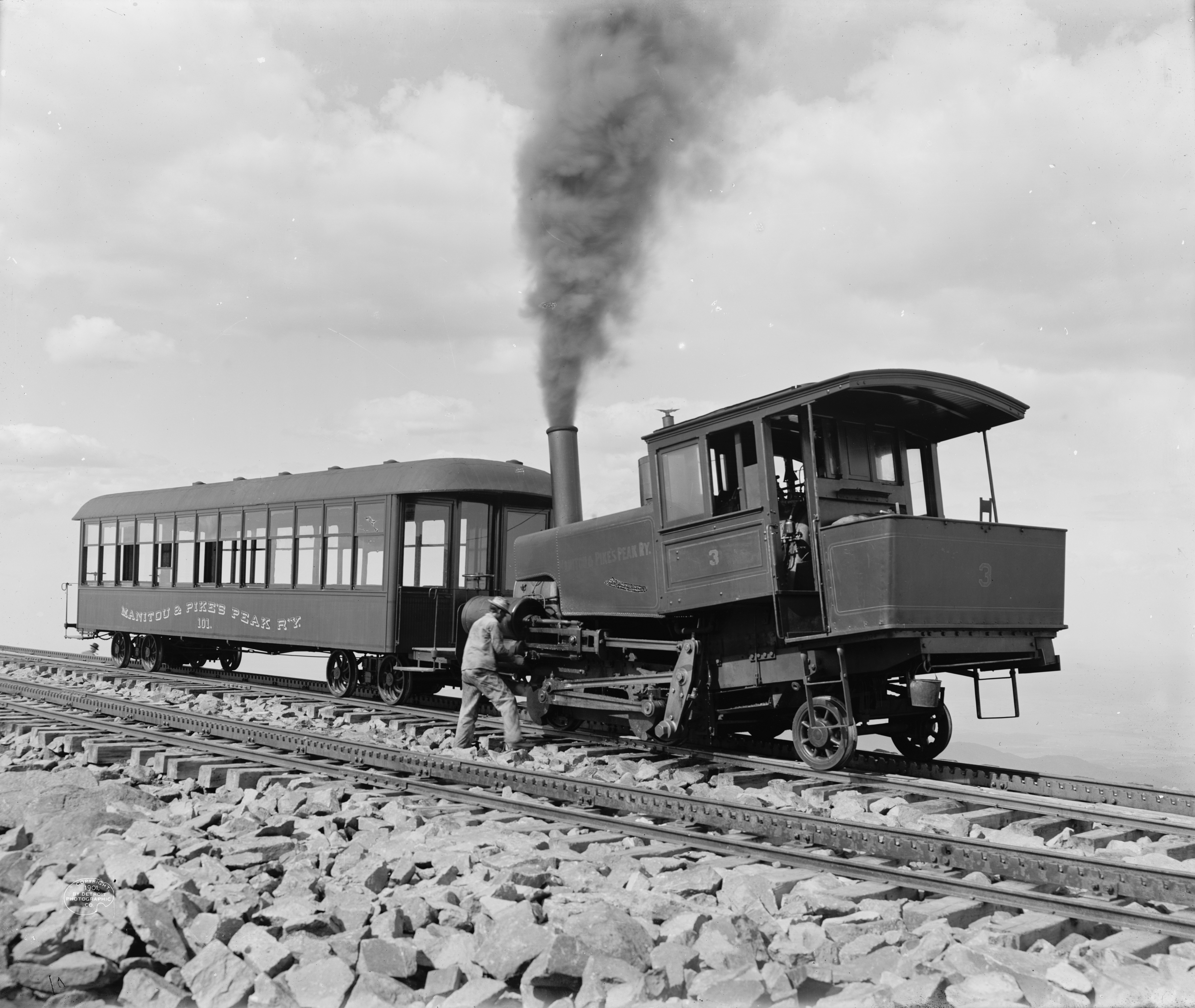
Pikes Peak Cog Railway locomotive and car, circa 1900

Construction was started in 1889, being built by Italian laborers using only pickaxes and assisted by donkeys. The line was built as a standard-gauge railway with an Abt rack system and wooden ties. Limited service was started in 1890 on the first segment of the line from Manitou Springs to the Halfway House Hotel. On June 30, 1891, the first train reached the summit.

Three steam locomotives were built for the line by the Baldwin Locomotive Works that each featured boilers offset by 16 degrees to keep them level on the steeply inclined grades. While most locomotives pull rail cars, these steam engines would push the line's wooden passenger cars up the mountain, decreasing the chance of a runaway car.

A fourth steam locomotive was added to the fleet in 1892 (which was built as a Vauclain compound), which proved to be more efficient and cut the cost of operating on a steep incline. The locomotive was so successful that the original locomotives were rebuilt as Vauclain compounds in 1893. Over time, the Vauclain compound technology made the locomotives notoriously difficult to maintain. An additional locomotive was added to the fleet in 1901 and again in 1906. All six steam locomotives were rebuilt in 1912 to similar specifications and would burn slightly under 1 ton of coal per trip.

=== Internal Combustion Era ===
Just before the start of the Great Depression, Spencer Penrose purchased a stake in the line. Penrose was the owner of The Broadmoor, a well-known hotel in Colorado Springs.

Under the control of Penrose, there was an effort to find more economical ways to operate the line. To that end, gasoline-powered railcar #7 was constructed in 1938. The railcar was intended to be a cheaper alternative to operating steam locomotives during quieter times of the year. The railcar was a huge success, and led the railroad to purchase five 'streamlined' diesel locomotives from General Electric, which were equipped with matching passenger cars, acquired from 1939 onward.

The diesel locomotives slowly supplanted the steam locomotives, though some steam operations persisted until the 1960s as backup power and to operate the snow-clearing train (where their greater weight meant they were less likely to derail).

The railroad started switching over to a fleet of self-propelled railcars in 1964, purchasing two units (#14 and #15) from Swiss Locomotive and Machine Works (SLM), which would be similar to equipment used on many Swiss cog railways. The air-cooled, 8-cylinder diesel engines in the first units proved to be less than satisfactory on the railroad above the tree line and were replaced by water-cooled engines. The railcars proved to be a good addition to the fleet and the railroad purchased two more railcars (#16 and #17) in 1968.

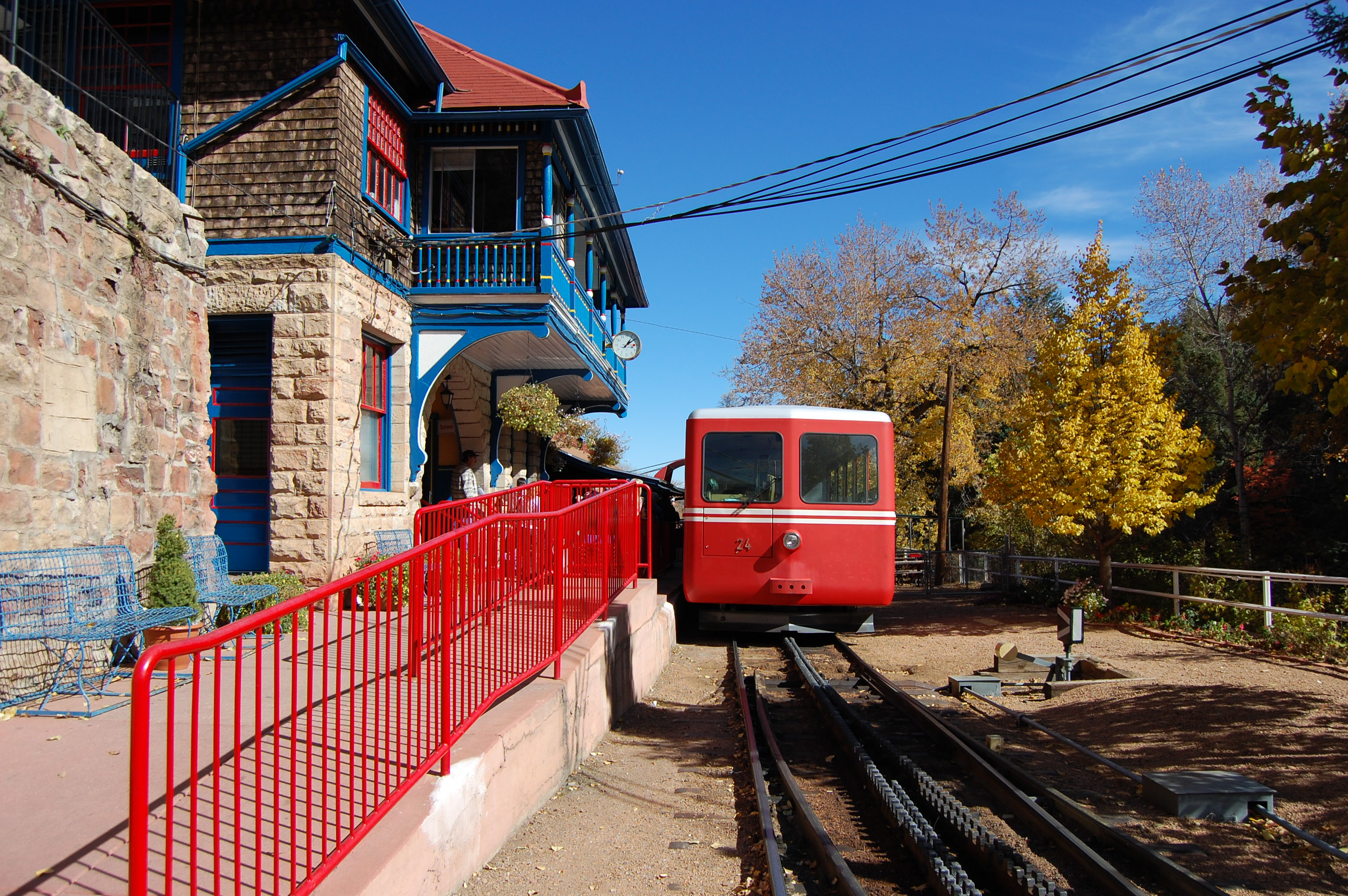
Railcar No. 24 prepares to depart from the Manitou Springs depot, which has been described as a blend of Victorian and Bavarian architecture

As tourism increased in the 1970s the railway needed more capacity. In 1976, the railway took delivery from SLM of two larger railcars (#18 and #19). These are identical in cosmetic appearance to cars 14-17, however consist of two articulated cars. Passing sidings were built at Minnehaha and Windy Point, allowing trains to pass at various points on the hill. Trains could previously pass only at Mountain View, permitting only three trains a day up the mountain. Eight trains per day became possible with the new equipment and sidings. Two additional two-car trainsets were added in the 1980s (#24 in 1984 and #25 in 1989).

== Revitalization ==
By the 2000s, the rail infrastructure was starting to show its age. Railway managers reported that in 2017 the track geometry had become so poor that the cog wheels were wearing out twice as quickly as they did in the 1980s. Winter operations were suspended on October 29, 2017, to conduct maintenance on the railway, but crews soon realized more serious repairs were needed and in March 2018 it was announced that the railway would close indefinitely.

The Anschutz Corporation, which owned the railway, estimated a full refurbishment of the line would cost $100 million. The company negotiated a deal with the city of Manitou Springs that would provide $36 million in tax breaks for the railroad over a 50-year period if the company completed the upgrades. The agreement was signed on November 20, 2018.

The major refurbishment project would involve the near-complete replacement of the track infrastructure, the rebuild of facilities and older railcars and the purchase of three new trainsets.

Starting in March 2019, crews ripped up the old rails, Abt rack system, and wooden ties, some of which had been in place since the line was first built in 1889. Work started at the depot in Manitou Springs and reached the summit in September. In May 2020, crews began working down from the top, laying down metal ties, new rails custom ordered from Poland and a new Strub rack system which featured more robust teeth. Crews also replaced the old manual track switches with radio-controlled versions that would enable faster operations at the passing sidings. Both of the stations were reconfigured, with a second track and side platform being added to the depot in Manitou Springs, while an island platform was built between the tracks at the summit, allowing both tracks to be used by passenger trains. Alongside the reconstruction of the railroad, the city of Colorado Springs (which operates the Pikes Peak Highway) constructed a new visitor center at the summit.

While the track work was underway, crews at the railroad shops in Manitou Springs began to rebuild the four two-car SLM railcars (Nos. 18, 19, 24 and 25). Each railcar was converted to the new Strub system, received a new transmission with a retarder for dynamic braking and was repowered with new diesel engines.

The railroad also placed an order for three push-pull trainsets (Nos. 27, 28 and 29) from Stadler Rail of Switzerland. Each trainset would consist of a diesel-electric locomotive, two coaches and a cab car, and marked a return to locomotive-hauled trains. Additionally, a snowblower (No. 30) was ordered from Stadler's partner, Zaugg AG Eggiwill of Switzerland. The snowblower has a diesel engine to turn its blades, but it is not self-propelled and instead acts as a control car and pushed by one of the Stadler locomotives. In February 2021, the new equipment was shipped from Switzerland to the United States, arriving in Manitou Springs the next month.

The line reopened on May 20, 2021. The fare has increased over the years. In 2023, the price for auto-assigned seatings was USD58.50 (adults) / USD48.50 (age 12 and under); or USD71 / USD61 for reserved seating.

== Manitou Incline ==
More commonly called simply the Manitou Incline, the Mount Manitou Scenic Incline Railway was actually a funicular up the side of a peak called Rocky Mountain located adjacent to Mount Manitou. It was operated by the Manitou and Pikes Peak Railway until its closure following a rockslide in 1990. This line's lower terminus was adjacent to the Cog Railway base station in Manitou Springs. The Manitou Incline averaged almost a 40% grade, gaining 2,011 feet (613 m) in elevation over a length of approximately 1 mile (1.6 km), with the maximum grade being 68%.

The Manitou Incline was initially built in 1907 for use in the construction of city water lines and a hydroelectric plant. When the construction was finished, the Manitou and Pikes Peak Railway took over the cable car as a tourist operation.

From 1990 forward, the defunct Incline had been controversial because, although legally off-limits to the public, its roadbed was heavily used for recreation and exercise by people ignoring the trespassing signs. It became legal to use the Incline on February 1, 2013. Colorado Springs Parks and Recreation manages the Incline trail through an intergovernmental agreement.

== Roster ==
Roster as of 2021:

No.	Built	Manufacturer	Type	Builders number	Class	Status	Notes	Photo
1	4/1890	Baldwin Locomotive Works	Steam locomotive	10835/ 13318	0-4-2T	On display at the Colorado Railroad Museum	Originally built as the "John Hulbert", rebuilt as a Vauclain Compound and numbered 1 in 3/1893	
2	5/1890	Baldwin Locomotive Works	Steam locomotive	10919/ 13319	0-4-2T	On display in Manitou Springs	Originally built as the "Manitou", renamed to "T.F. Richardson" at some point before 1898. Rebuilt as a Vauclain Compound and numbered #2 in 3/1893.	
3	5/1890	Baldwin Locomotive Works	Steam locomotive	10920/ 13324	0-4-2T	Scrapped for parts	Originally built as "Pike's Peak", rebuilt as a Vauclain Compound and numbered #3 in 3/1893	
1st 4	5/1892	Baldwin Locomotive Works	Steam locomotive	12681	0-4-2T	Wrecked August 31, 1896, scrapped	The smallest engine the railway owned, was known as the "little 4". It was the first engine delivered as a Vauclain Compound, and its superiority over the previous 3 engines resulted in them being sent back to Baldwin to be rebuilt. Broke a side rod and ran away in August 1896.	
2nd 4	1/1897	Baldwin Locomotive Works	Steam locomotive	15173	0-4-2T	On display at the Grand Canyon Railway	Built to replace the wrecked #4 using the specifications of the original larger engines. #4 Was sent to the Colorado Railroad Museum after retirement in October 1968. It was then traded for #1 in November 1979 and steamed up again for a number of years before being loaned to the Grand Canyon Railway during renovations.	
5	4/1901	Baldwin Locomotive Works	Steam locomotive	18939	0-4-2T	On display at The Broadmoor	First engine built with an automatic brake. This engine was displayed at the Cog Railway Depot in Manitou for many years before being moved to the Broadmoor Hotel and put on display.	
6	6/1906	Baldwin Locomotive Works	Steam locomotive	28401	0-6-0T	Scrapped 1955	#6 was delivered as an Oil burner, it was converted to burn coal in 1907. #6 was the largest and most powerful engine delivered to the cog railway, however it suffered from mechanical issues and was usually the last engine in the lineups.	
7	1938	Colorado Midland Shops	Gas railcar (diesel)			On display at the Colorado Railroad Museum	#7 was built in the Colorado Midland shops in 1938 for the purpose of having a smaller piece of equipment to run that was cheaper to operate when the off season occurred. Originally General Motors powered with 707 gasoline engines, it was repowered by a Cadillac V8 in the early 1950s and finally with a Cummins diesel in the 1990s.	
8	1939	General Electric	Diesel electric locomotive	12454		Sold to the Garden of the Gods	First GE Unit delivered to the railway, builders number 12454. It had 3 2 stroke General Motors 71 engines and internal dynamic brakes. Was retired with the arrival of the Swiss units and robbed of parts to maintain other engines.	
9	1946	General Electric	Diesel electric locomotive	28372		On display at the Colorado Railroad Museum	Unit 9 was powered by 2 Cummins NHS diesels as built. Later rebuilt to have twin Cummins 855 Diesels.	
10	1950	General Electric	Diesel electric locomotive	30279		Rebuilt as No. 22	Unit 10 was powered by 2 Cummins NHS diesels as built. The frame of this unit was the basis for snowplow 22.	
11	1950	General Electric	Diesel electric locomotive	30280		Sold to the Garden of the Gods	Unit 11 was powered by 2 Cummins NHS diesels as built. Later rebuilt with Cummins 855 diesels.	
12	1955	Manitou and Pikes Peak shops	Diesel electric locomotive			Rebuilt as No. 23	Built by the railroad shops, unit 12 was powered by 2 General Motors 110 diesels. Was built to the same body style as the GE built units. Rebuilt to Unit 23 1982.	
14	1963	Swiss Locomotive and Machine Works	Diesel electric railcar	4441	Bhm 2/4	Stored	78 Passenger. 14 was built with air-cooled V8 diesels. Rebuilt in the shops to have Cummins 743 engines following the air-cooled engine's failures at altitude. Later re-engined with Cummins 855s from units 18/19.	
15	1963	Swiss Locomotive and Machine Works	Diesel electric railcar	4442	Bhm 2/4	On display in Woodland Park, Colorado	78 Passenger. Built with air-cooled V8s. It was returned to Switzerland after overheating issues and received Cummins 743s. Later 855s from units 18/19.	
16	1968	Swiss Locomotive and Machine Works	Diesel electric railcar	4778	Bhm 2/4	Stored	78 Passenger. Built with Cummins 743s, re-powered with a big cam 855.	
17	1968	Swiss Locomotive and Machine Works	Diesel electric railcar	4779	Bhm 2/4	Stored	78 Passenger. Built with Cummins 743s, re-powered with 855s from units 18/19.	
18	1975	Swiss Locomotive and Machine Works	Diesel hydraulic railcar	5046	Bhm 4/8	Active Service	214 Passenger two-car unit. Built with Cummins small cam 855s, later re-powered with big cam 855s.	
19	1975	Swiss Locomotive and Machine Works	Diesel hydraulic railcar	5047	Bhm 4/8	Active Service	214 Passenger two-car unit. Built with Cummins small cam 855s, later re-powered with big cam 855s.	
20	1934	Manitou and Pikes Peak Shops	Gas railcar			Scrapped	A self-propelled work vehicle built in the shops in 1934. Its original Pierce Arrow engine was replaced by number 7's former 707 engine in the 1950s. Unit later received the number 20 and was scrapped in 1982. It was replaced in work service by a rebuilt unit 23.	
21	1953	Manitou and Pikes Peak Shops	Snowplow			Scrapped	Built in house in the 1950s, powered by General Motors 110 engines. This rotary snowplow proved to be unsuccessful in clearing large drifts from the track and it was replaced with snowplow 22.	
22	1974	American Snowblast	Diesel hydraulic snowplow			On display at the Pueblo Railway Museum	Built on the frame of GE #10. Diesel Hydraulic with a Cummins 1710 V-12.	
23	1982	Manitou and Pikes Peak shops	Diesel electric railcar			Retired	Self-propelled work vehicle, built from No. 12 following the scrapping of No. 20. It had a roll up door and single Cummins 855 for power.	
24	1983	Swiss Locomotive and Machine Works	Diesel hydraulic railcar	5275	Bhm 4/8	Active Service	214 Passenger two-car unit. Delivered with Cummins 855s.	
25	1988	Swiss Locomotive and Machine Works	Diesel hydraulic railcar	5418	Bhm 4/8	Active Service	214 Passenger two-car unit. Delivered with Cummins 855s.	
27	2021	Stadler Rail	Diesel electric locomotive		Hm 4/4	Active Service	Paired with two coaches (27B, 27C) and a control car (27A). Also used to push snowblower #30.	
28	2021	Stadler Rail	Diesel electric locomotive		Hm 4/4	Active Service	Paired with two coaches (28B, 28C) and a control car (28A). Also used to push snowblower #30.	Unit 28 with its coach set moving out of Jones' Shed
29	2021	Stadler Rail	Diesel electric locomotive		Hm 4/4	Active Service	Paired with two coaches (29B, 29C) and a control car (29A). Also used to push snowblower #30.	
30	2021	Zaugg AG Eggiwil	Diesel Electric		Xrot m	Active Service	Snowblower To be pushed by a Stadler Hm 4/4 diesel electric locomotive in operation.	
104	1890	Wasson Wooden Coach	Passenger Coach			Moved to Pueblo Railway Historical Society in Pueblo, Colorado		

== See also ==
- Abt system
- Green Mountain Cog Railway
- List of Colorado historic railroads
- List of heritage railroads in the United States
- List of rack railways
- Mount Washington Cog Railway
- Quincy and Torch Lake Cog Railway
