= Manitou Mineral Springs =

- Manitou Springs Historic District
- U.S. National Register of Historic Places
- U.S. Historic district
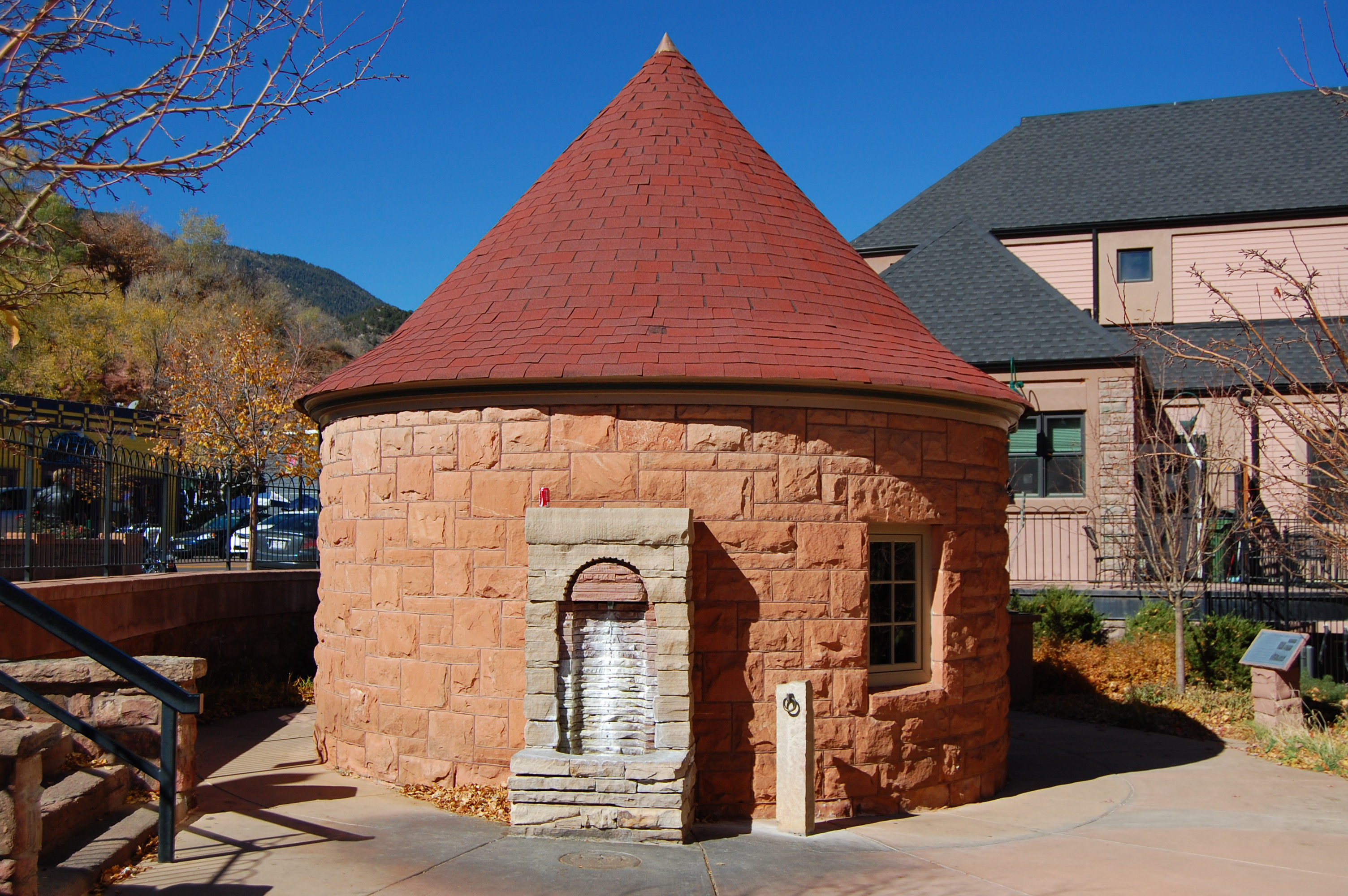
- Shoshone Spring, Manitou Avenue

- Location within Colorado Location within the United States
- Location: Manitou Springs, Colorado
- Coordinates: 38°51′28″N 104°55′14″W
- NRHP reference No.: 83003516
- Added to NRHP: 1983

Manitou Mineral Springs are natural mineral springs in Manitou Springs, Colorado and Cheyenne Spring House is on the National Register of Historic Places. The springs are located in one of the country's largest National Historic Districts.

== Manitou Springs ==
Manitou Springs, also called "Saratoga of the West", was established as a resort community, known for its mineral springs and "spectacular setting" at the edge of the Rocky Mountains and the base of Pikes Peak.

== Geology ==
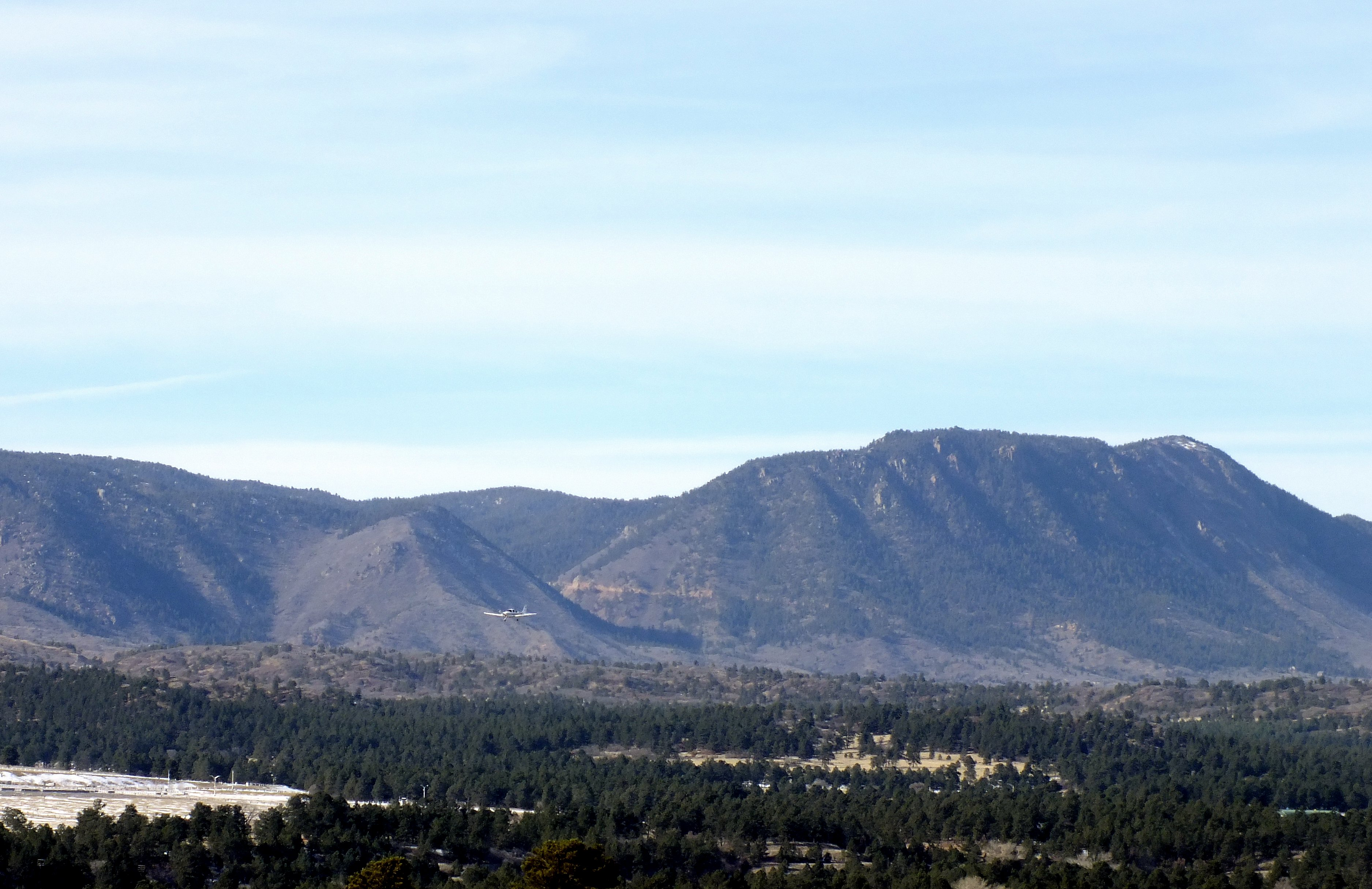
Rampart Range

The spring water of Manitou Springs originates from two sources. "Deep-seated waters" of Rampart Range and Ute Pass provide one source of mineral water. Water below the surface is run through cavernous drainage systems called karst aquifers. Limestone in the water dissolves and resulting carbonic acid, or carbon dioxide, make the water "effervescent". The water rises to the surface naturally. This process is an artesian process where as water rises through layers of rock it picks up minerals and soda, or sodium bicarbonate. Some of the spring water also comes from "surface" waters from the watershed basins of Fountain Creek and Williams Canyon. Each spring has a different mineral content and because of that, a different taste.

== History ==
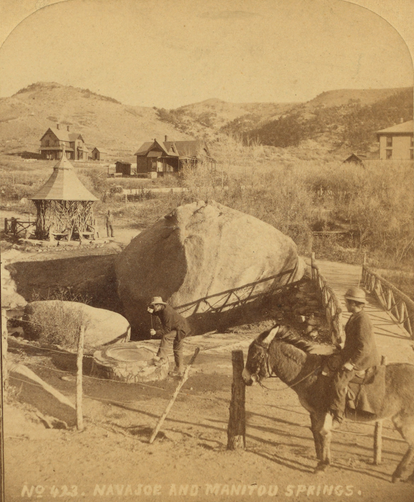
Navajo and Manitou springs, Colorado, from Robert N. Dennis collection of stereoscopic views

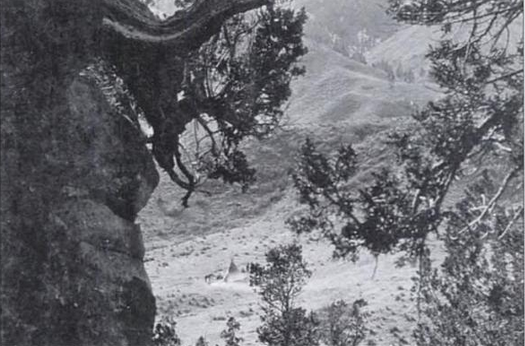
Valley of springs where Ute came to hunt and use the mineral springs. The center of the photograph shows a "lone encampment" of Ute Native Americans, between 1874 and 1879.

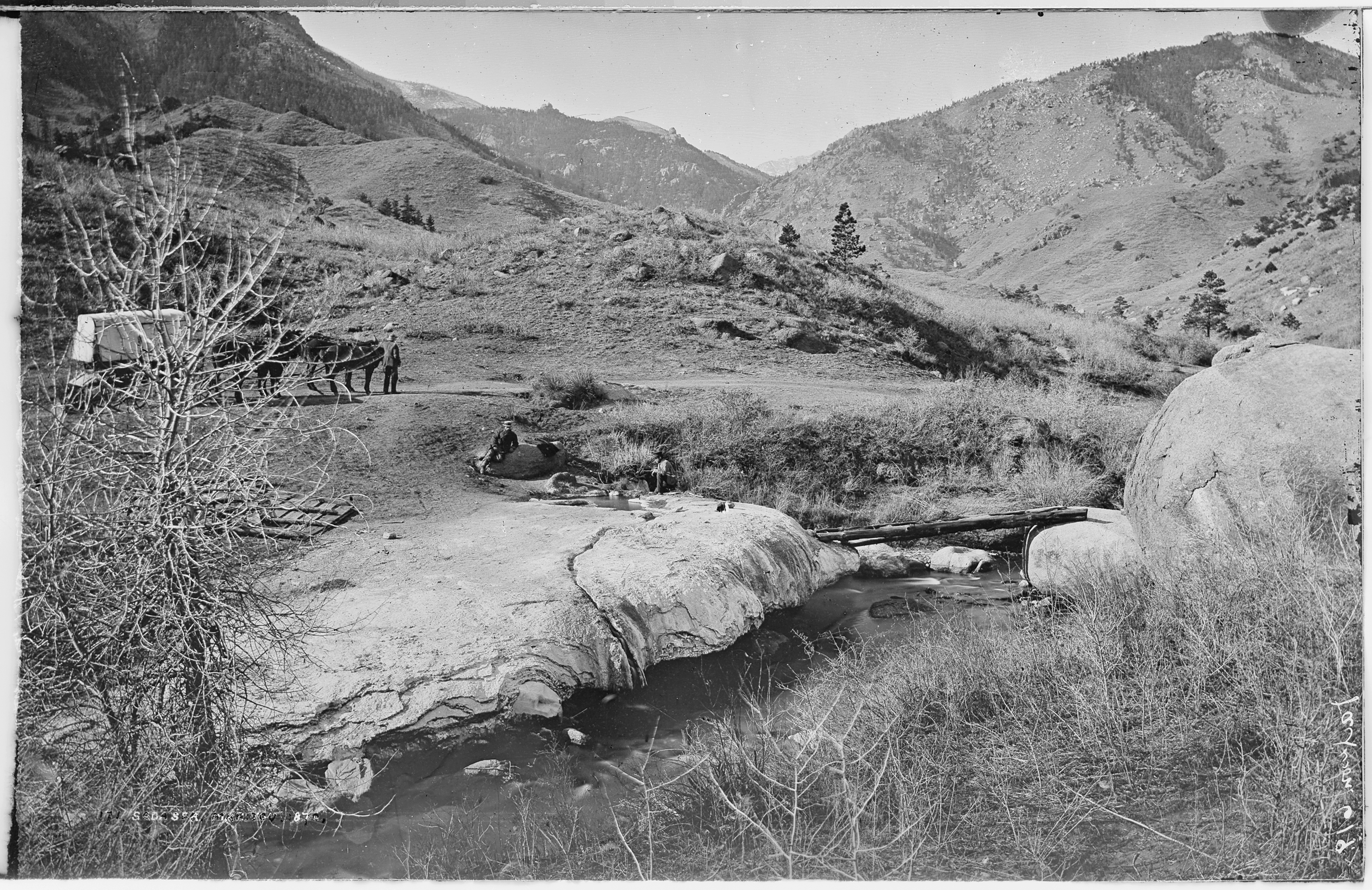
Soda spring, 1870

The town has several mineral springs, called manitou for the "breath of the Great Spirit Manitou" believed to have created the bubbles, or "effervescence", in the spring water. The springs were considered sacred grounds where Native Americans drank and soaked in the mineral water to replenish and heal themselves. Ute, Arapaho, Cheyenne and other plains tribes came to the area, spent winters there, and "share[d] in the gifts of the waters without worry of conflict." There were 9 or 10 natural springs. As whites moved in there were "skirmishes" for access to the historical resort area until the Native Americans were removed from the area and placed on reservations.

Explorer Stephen Harriman Long made note of the water's healing properties in 1820. His expedition's botanist and geologist, Edwin James, noted the healing benefits of the water; He was also the first European man believed to have climbed Pikes Peak. George Frederick Ruxton wrote of the "boiling waters" in a book about his travels. Recognizing the extent to which Native Americans considered the site to be sacred, Ruxton wrote: "...the basin of the spring (at Manitou) was filled with beads and wampum, and pieces of red cloth and knives, while the surrounding trees were hung with strips of deer skin, cloth and moccosons (sic)."

Forty-eight years later, a plan for a health resort was developed by Dr. William Abraham Bell and William Jackson Palmer, a general during the Civil War: "They had a vision of dreamy summer villas nestled in the mountains, with grand hotels and landscaped parks clustered around the springs." Railroad transportation brought people into the area, first called Fountain Colony and La Font. The town wasn't built at envisioned by the two men, storefronts and homes were built in the town. It became the first resort town in the state. (Note: In addition to their development investments in Colorado Springs and Manitou Springs, Bell and Palmer invested in the Denver and Rio Grande Western Railroad to bring tourists to the towns of Colorado Springs and Manitou Springs from Denver. Bell, who was British, encouraged so many people from his homeland to visit the Pikes Peak area that Colorado Springs became known and "Little London". Horses and buggies at the railroad station in Colorado Springs transported visitors to Manitou Springs.)

In 1873 Henry McAllister, a developer working for Palmer, touted the medicinal benefits of the springs and that Manitou Springs had the necessary components of a successful spa resort, including "incomparable climate and scenery".

Medical practitioners, such as Dr. Edwin Solly, promoted the health benefits of the "pure air" and sunny Rocky Mountain climate as the "world's best suited therapeutic environment" for the treatment of tuberculosis. He also believed in the benefits of mineral spring water which drew tourists and the infirm, particularly people with tuberculosis, to the area. Some springs were enclosed as the town grew. One of the enclosures, in red sandstone and under a "conical roofed structure", is the Cheyenne Spring House. There were more than 50 drilled wells and springs after the turn of the century. Since then, more were enclosed. After a period when the town's popularity diminished, some springs were closed, capped or paved over. Then the Mineral Springs Foundation was formed in 1987 to restore some of the springs and promote the benefits of the town's spring water. Walking tours of the town's springs are called "Springabouts".

Manitou Springs water was sold "worldwide".

== Springs ==
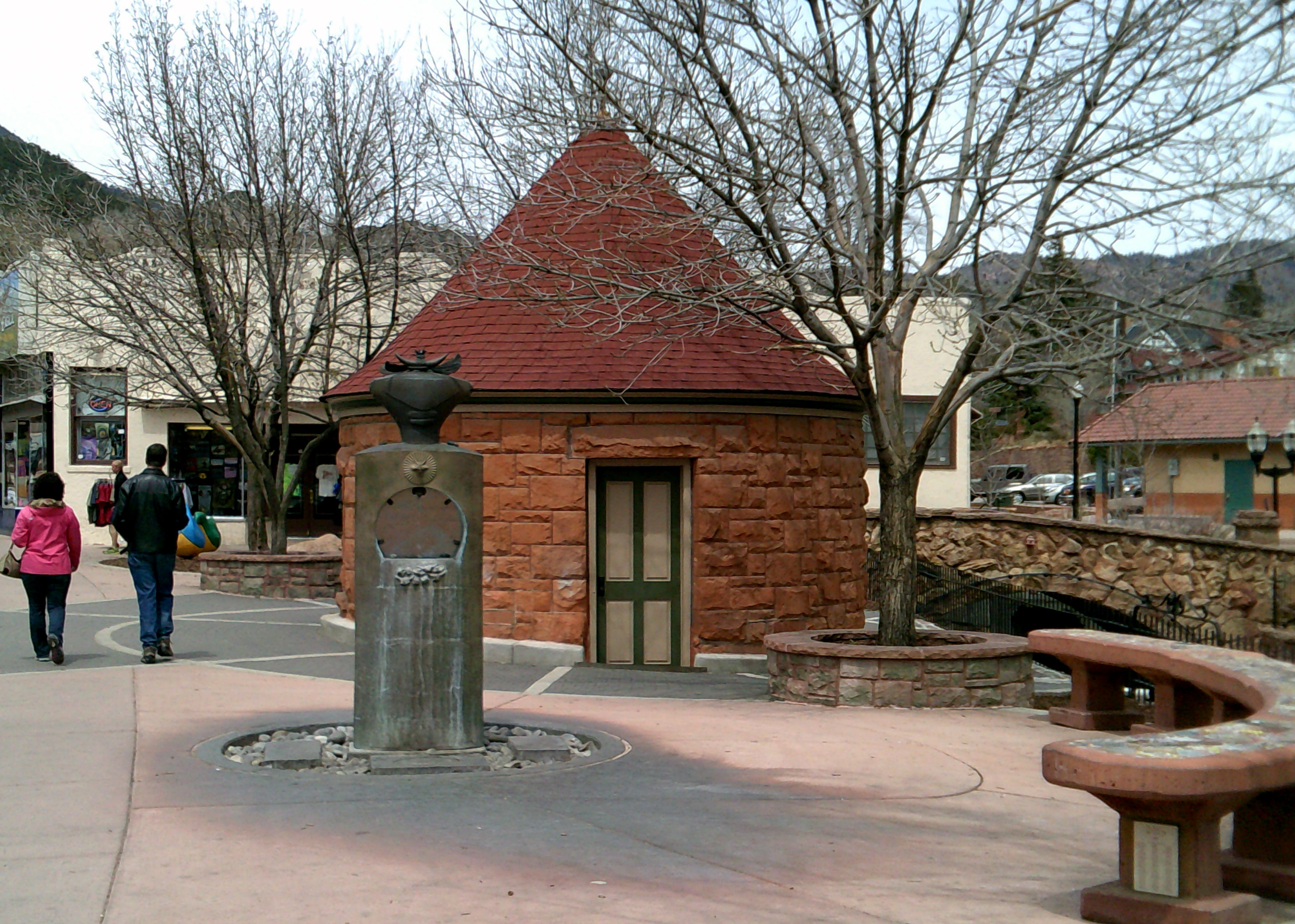
Cheyenne Spring House, Manitou Avenue

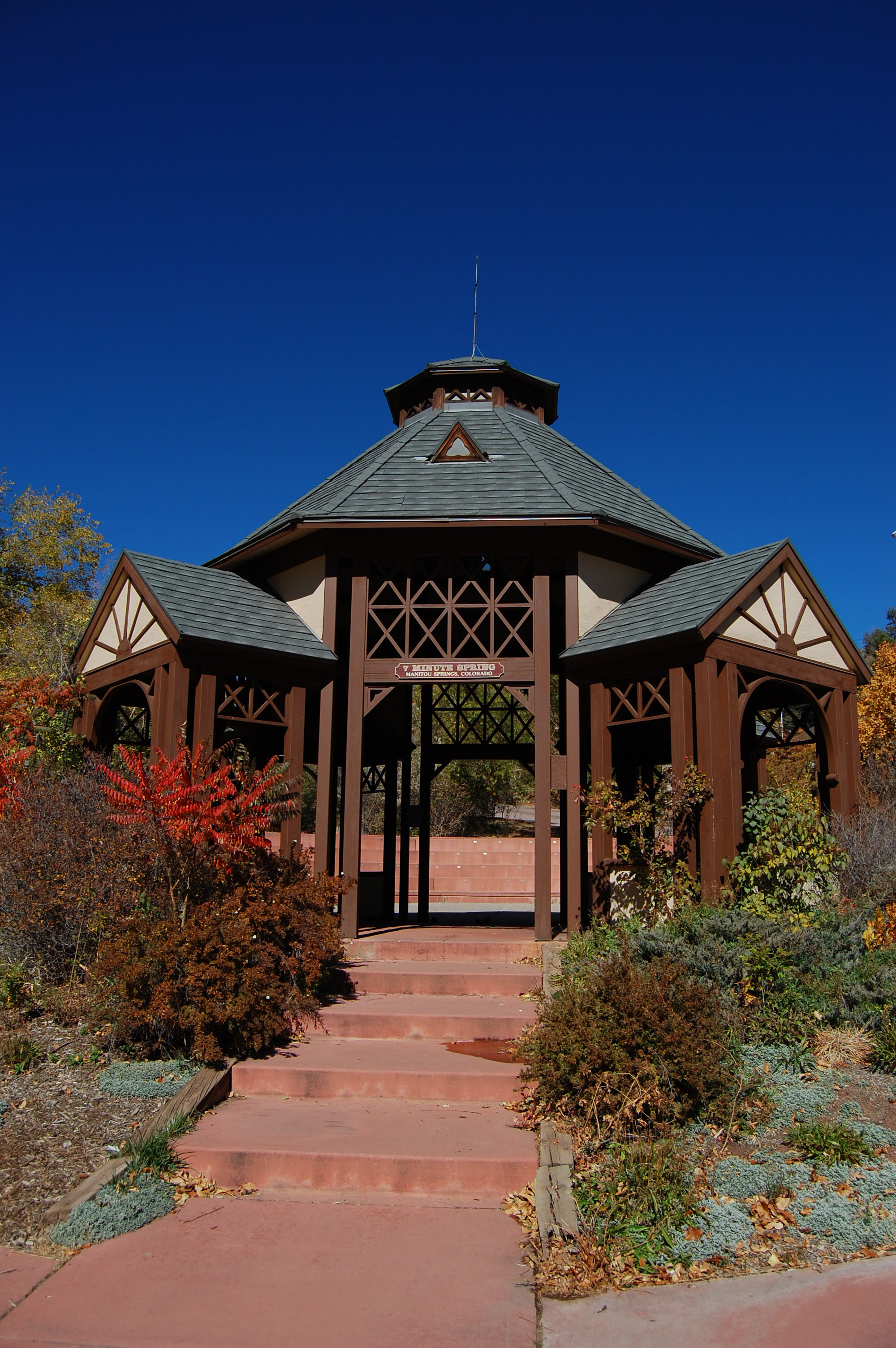
7 Minute Spring, October 21, 2012

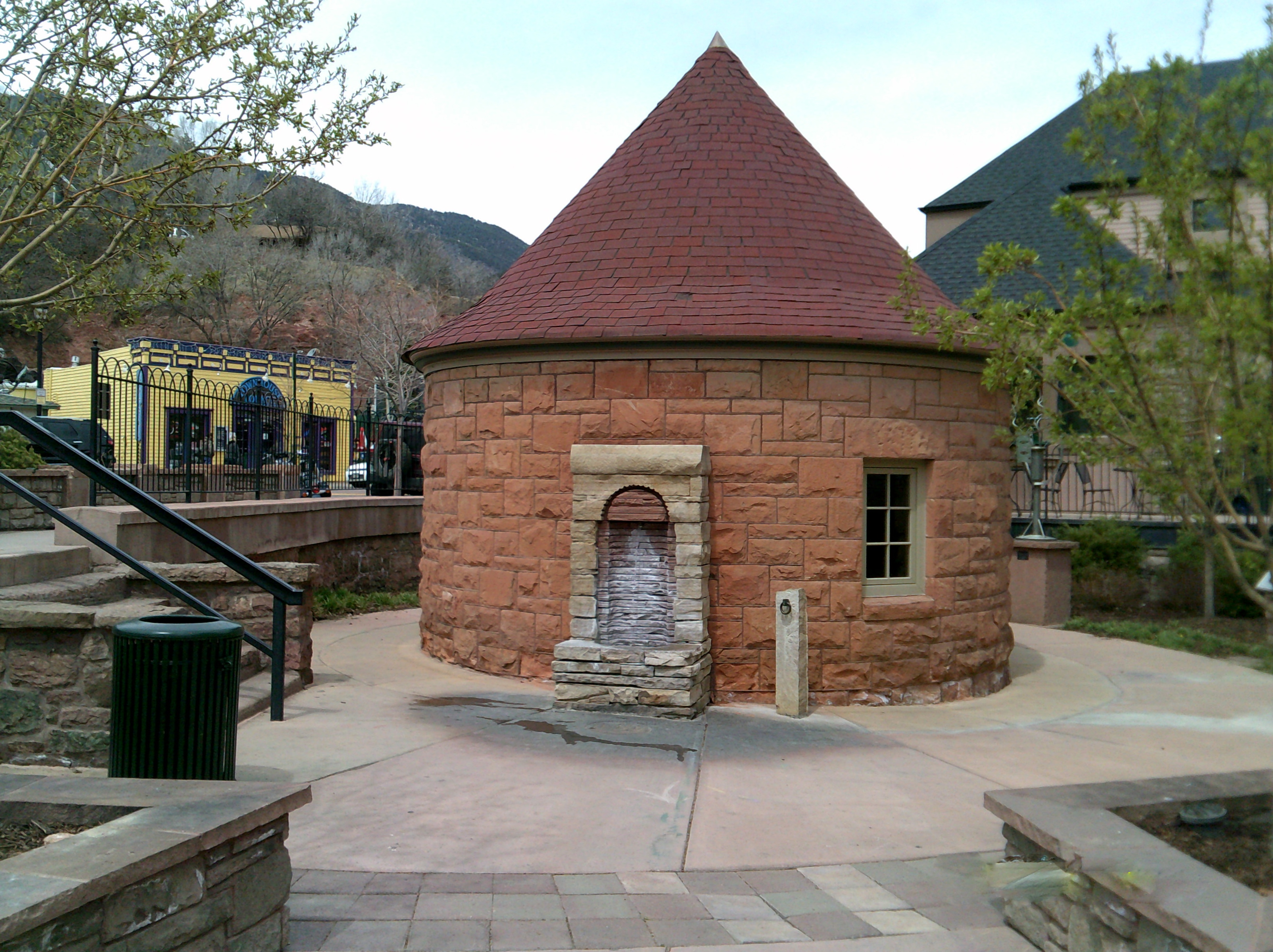
Shoshone Spring, Manitou Avenue

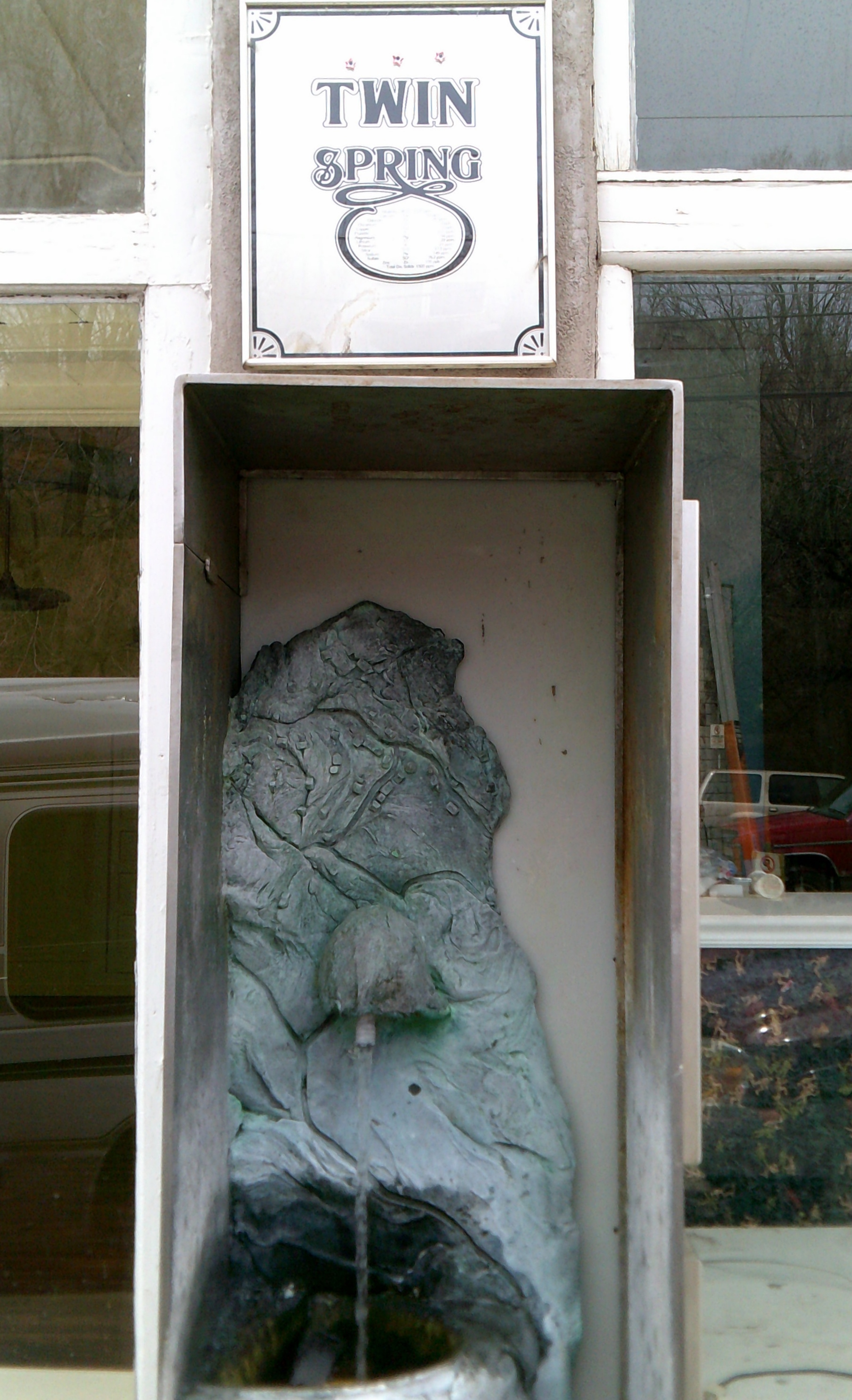
Twin Spring, Ruxton Avenue

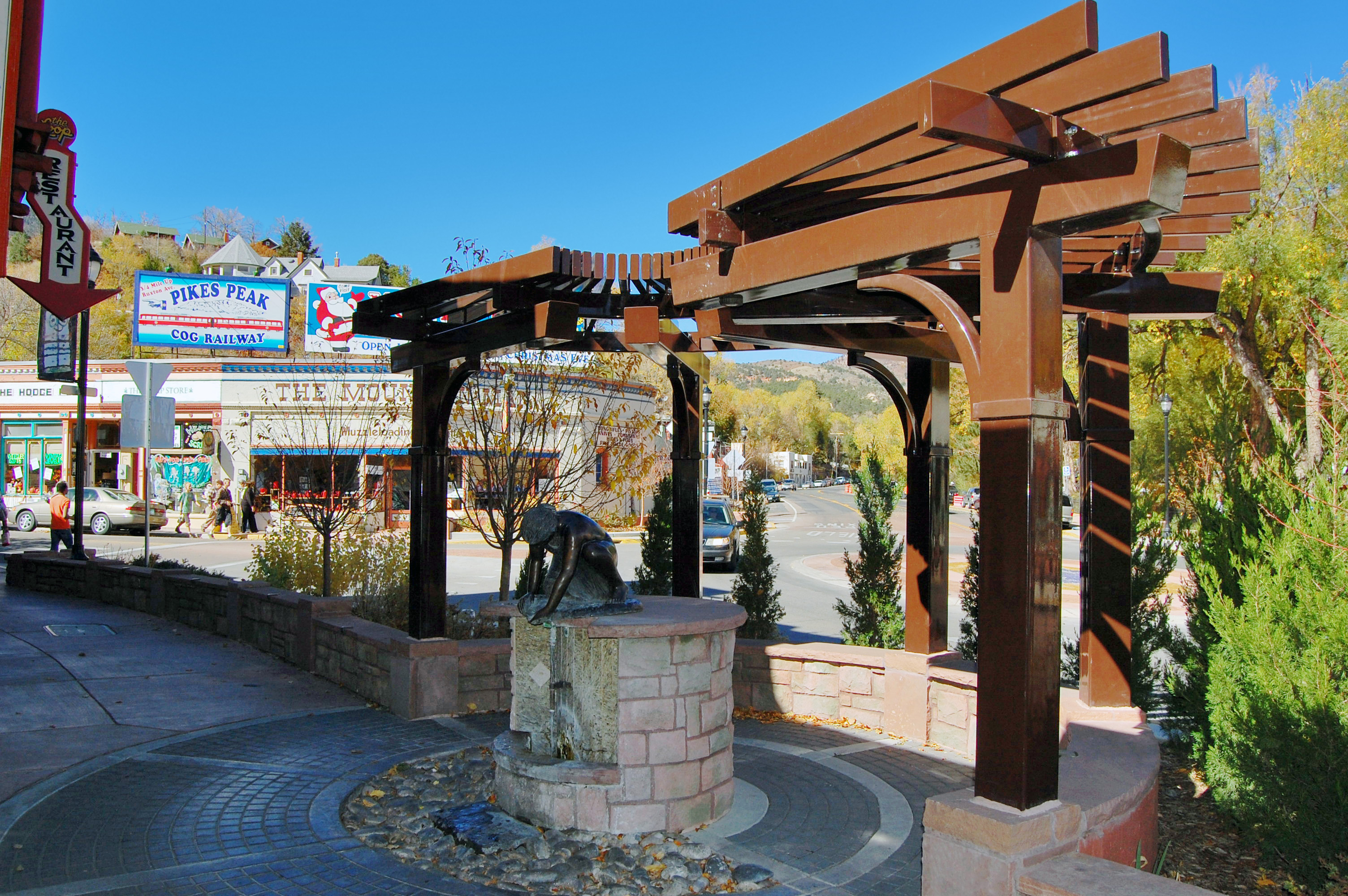
Stratton Spring, October 21, 2012

=== 7 Minute Spring ===
The 7 Minute Spring was drilled near the former Manitou House Hotel in 1909. Every 7 minutes a geyser erupted. In 1993 a park was developed surrounding a newly drilled spring. Don Green, Maxine Green, and Bill Burgess collaborated on two fonts at the spring.

=== Cheyenne Spring House ===
Cheyenne Spring House, near the Navajo Spring and the Spa, was built in the 1890s of red sandstone. It is a soda spring. Like the Navajo Spring, it has a high overall mineral content, but not a high content of any specific mineral. The building was constructed by the Manitou Mineral Water company. Its sweet water comes from limestone aquifers thought to be more than 20,000 years old and located about one mile below the surface. The spring's water is available to the public in the bronze sculpture by Paul Rogers that stands a few feet from the spring house.

=== Iron Spring Geyser ===
The Iron Spring Geyser was drilled on Ruxton Avenue in 1910 by Joseph Hiestand to increase the availability of iron-rich mineral water, also known as a chalybeate water, in the town. The spring water also contains a high content of fluoride, silica, sodium and potassium. In the 1880s "health seekers" stopped at the spring during their daily walk.

=== Navajo Geyser ===
Previously, the spring would erupt every 45 minutes and shoot up to 7 feet into the air. It was located in the Navajo Geyser Pavilion. The spring which is privately owned was restored in 2006, but ceased to flow in later years. There is now no sign of the Spring in the Manitou Outpost store building where the guide's photo displayed it. The spring was plugged and a sidewalk was paved over it. The spring was later renovated into the hand pump that exists today.

=== Navajo Spring ===
Native Americans and early settlers came to the Navajo Spring along the Ute Trail to take the water believed to have healing powers. Its water supplied the local bathhouse and was the source of the bottled spring water sold as "Ginger Champagne" and "Manitou Table Water". In general, the water has a high mineral content, but does not have an exceeding level of any particular minerals. The spring font, designed by Chris Dysart, is located behind the Patsy's popcorn kiosk on Manitou Avenue.

=== Shoshone Spring ===
Shoshone Spring's spring house, built in the 1890s, is located on Manitou Avenue. It has the "greatest amount of deep-seated water from the karst aquifer system and the highest mineral content of the town's springs, and particularly high content of chloride, calcium, alkalinity, lithium, manganese and zinc. Because of its high mineral content, it was considered the most "medicinal" of Manitou's springs, partly because of its sulphur content. The spring house was constructed of red sandstone from the nearby Kenmuir Quarry, which is now the Red Rock Canyon Open Space.

=== Soda Spring ===
Soda Spring is one of the natural springs in Manitou Springs and once in an open air pavilion, the spring is located now in the Spa building basement.

=== Stratton Spring ===
Stratton Spring, named for Winfield Scott Stratton, was drilled in 1936 by the Stratton Foundation. It is located at "the loop", a circular intersection at the end of Manitou Avenue, which was the end of the avenue's railroad car line in the early 20th century. A sculpture, created by Fred Darpino, is located at the site.

=== Twin Spring ===
Located on Ruxton Avenue, Twin Spring combines waters from two different depths and flow from one font. The spring was once called Twin Lithia Springs, as Lithium is present in the spring water at a concentration of .233 mg/L. The water, high in magnesium, is considered a "sweet" water, used by locals to make lemonade. Aside from the pleasing taste, it is also sought for its potassium and calcium content. The spring was drilled by William S. Crosby in the 1920s.

=== Ute Chief Spring ===
The spring, located at the far western end of Manitou Avenue, is a privately owned spring. A sculpture, created by Steve Titus, of a Native American man symbolizes the historic use of advertising sculptures established around town to promote bottled Ute Chief Mineral Water. The metal sculpture is a replica of the original plaster sculpture of the same design that was on the site in the first half of the twentieth century. The Ute Chief Spring no longer flows.

=== Wheeler Spring ===
The spring was drilled in 1920 by the son-in-law of Jerome B. Wheeler, an investor in Aspen and Manitou Springs, Colorado, creating the Manitou Mineral Water bottling plant and building the Wheeler Clock on Manitou Avenue. (He also built the Hotel Jerome in Aspen.) The spring is located near the location of his home, Windemere, which is where the United States Post Office is now located.

== See also ==
- Jacob Schueler, founder of the Ute Chief Mineral Springs bottling works in Manitou Springs
