= Geography of Denver =

The City and County of Denver, Colorado, is located at 39°43'35" North, 104°57'56" West (39.726287, −104.965486) in the Colorado Front Range region. The Southern Rocky Mountains lie to the west of Denver and the High Plains lie to the east.

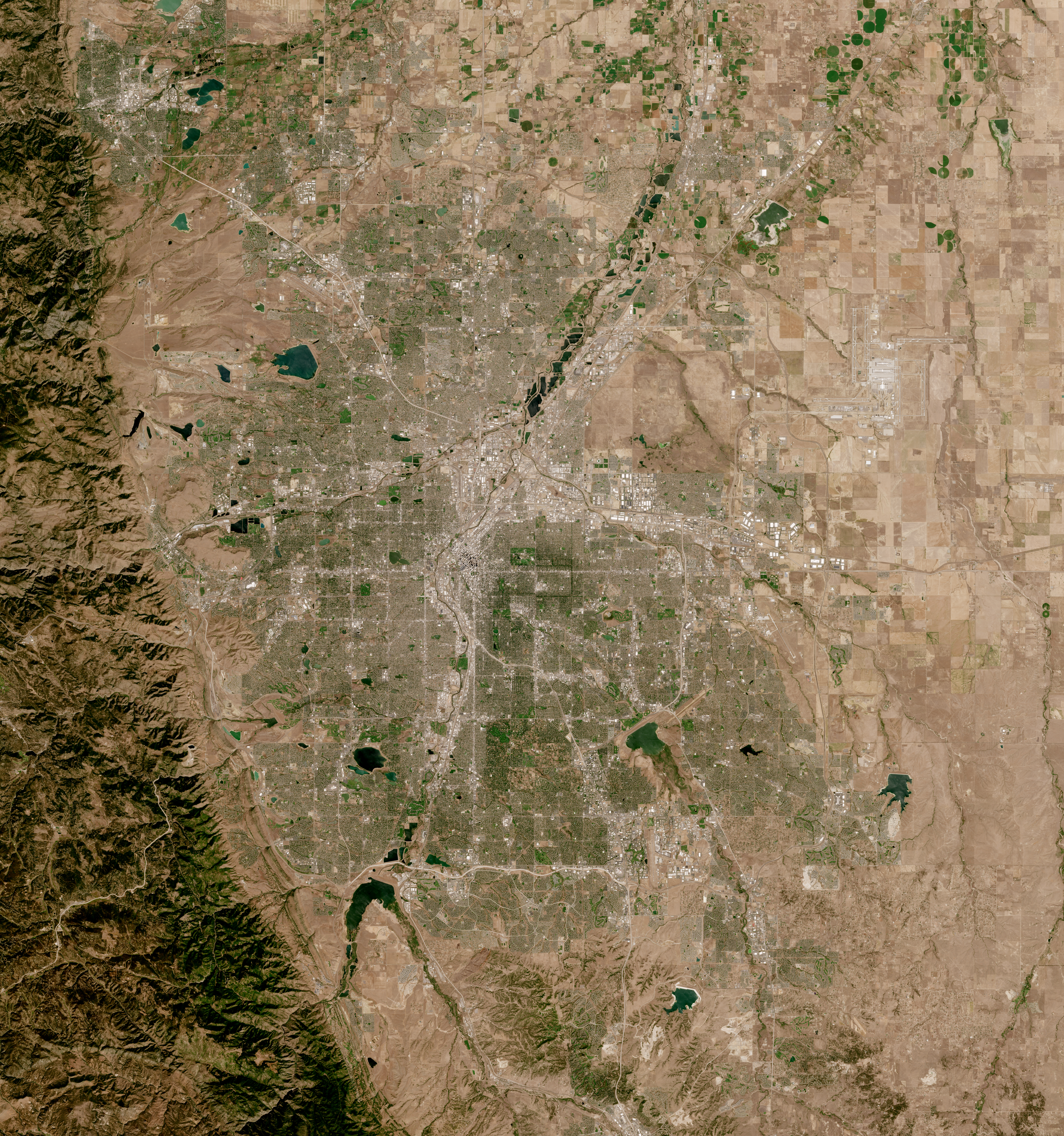
Satellite image of the Denver metropolitan area

According to the United States Census Bureau, the city has a total area of 154.9 square miles (400 square kilometers). 153.4 sq mi (397 km^{2}) of it is land and 1.6 sq mi (4.1 km^{2}) of it is water. The total area is 1.03% water.

== Adjacent counties ==
- Adams County, Colorado - north and east
- Arapahoe County, Colorado - south and east and southeastern enclaves
- Jefferson County, Colorado - west

== Adjacent cities ==
- City of Commerce City - north
- City of Brighton – north (separated by a strip of unincorporated Adams County)
- City of Aurora – east
- City of Glendale – southeastern enclave
- City of Greenwood Village - south
- City of Cherry Hills Village - south
- City of Englewood -south
- City of Sheridan -south
- Town of Bow Mar - south
- City of Littleton - south
- City of Lakewood -west
- City of Edgewater -west
- City of Wheat Ridge -west
- Town of Mountain View -west
- Town of Lakeside - west
- City of Arvada – northwest (separated by a strip of unincorporated Jefferson County)
- Berkley CDP - north
- North Washington CDP - north

== Climate ==
Denver

Climate chart (precipitation, max. and min. temperature)
J	F	M	A	M	J	J	A	S	O	N	D
0.4 44 17	0.4 46 19	0.9 54 26	1.7 62 33	2.1 72 43	2 82 52	2.2 89 59	1.7 87 58	1 79 48	1 65 37	0.6 52 24	0.4 44 17
- █ Average max. and min. temperatures in °F
- █ Precipitation totals in inches
- Source: NOAA
Metric conversion
J	F	M	A	M	J	J	A	S	O	N	D
10 7 −8	9.4 8 −7	23 12 −3	43 16 1	54 22 6	50 28 11	55 32 15	43 31 14	24 26 9	26 19 3	15 11 −4	8.9 7 −8
- █ Average max. and min. temperatures in °C
- █ Precipitation totals in mm

Denver features a semi-arid climate (Köppen climate classification: BSk) with very low humidity and around 3,100 hours of sunshine per year. The weather of the city and surrounding area is influenced by the proximity of the Rocky Mountains to the west. The climate, while generally mild compared to the mountains to the west and the plains further east, can be moderately unpredictable. Measurable amounts of snow have fallen in Denver as late as Memorial Day and as early as Labor Day. Most recently, Denver received an inch of snow on September 8, 2020, making this the second earliest measurable snowfall on record.

The average temperature in Denver is 50.4 °F (10.2 °C), and the average yearly precipitation is 14.30 inches (363 millimeters). The average window for measurable (≥0.1 in or 0.25 cm) snowfall is October 17 through April 27, averaging 53.8 in (136.7 cm) of seasonal accumulation for 1981−2010. Denver averages 270 clear and partly cloudy days per year or 3200 hours of sunshine making it one of the sunniest major cities. Denver receives more precipitation than most locations with semi-arid climates, but still features a semi-arid climate due to its high evapotranspiration.

Denver's winters are normally dry and range from mild to moderately cold, and although large amounts of snow can fall on the mountains just west of the city, the effects of orographic lift dry out the air passing over the Front Range shadowing the city from precipitation for much of the season. Additionally, warm chinook winds can occasionally be felt as air passing over the mountains heats as it descends, bringing a melting snow cover and surging temperatures; from December to February there is an average of 12−18 days of 50 °F (10 °C)+ highs and 1−3 days of above-freezing lows per month. The coldest temperature ever recorded in Denver was recorded on January 9, 1875, at −29 °F (−34 °C), though the last time Denver recorded a temperature below −20 °F (−29 °C) was December 22, 2022.

Spring brings with it significant changes as Denver can be affected by air masses on all sides, whether arctic air from the north, which occasionally combines with Pacific storm fronts bringing snow to the city. As reported at Denver International, March is the second snowiest month, averaging 10.7 inches (27.2 cm) of snow. Additionally, warm air from the Gulf of Mexico can bring the first thunderstorms of the season, and continental warm air can bring summer-like warm and dry conditions. The last freeze of the season on average falls on May 6.

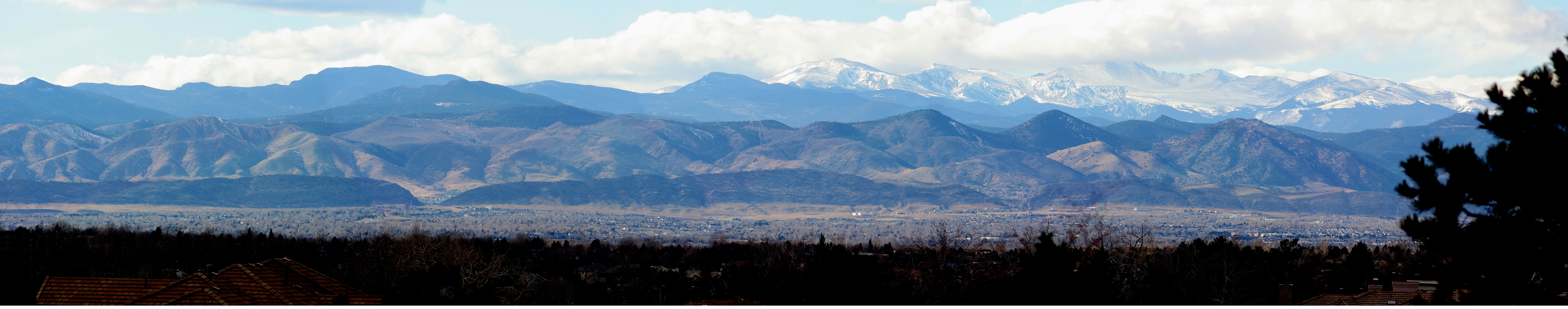
The Front Range as seen from Westlands Park in Greenwood Village.

Starting in mid-July, the monsoon brings tropical moisture into the city, and with it comes occasional short late-afternoon thunderstorms. However, despite this tropical moisture, humidity levels during the day generally remain very low, and lows rarely remain at or above 70 °F (21 °C). There are 38 days of 90 °F (32 °C)+ highs per year, though 100 °F (38 °C)+ highs are not seen annually. The average window for temperatures reaching the former threshold is June 4 thru September 7.

In the autumn, the tropical monsoon flow dies down and as arctic air begins to approach it can combine with moisture from the Pacific Northwest to bring snowfall to the city – November is Denver's third snowiest month, and both the greatest snowfall from a single storm and daily snow depth on record occurred before the Winter Solstice.

In general diurnal temperature range is large, averaging between 26.7 and 30.5 °F (14.8 and 16.9 °C).

Extreme statistics (since 1872 unless otherwise indicated):

- All-time record high: 105 °F (41 °C) on August 8, 1878, July 20, 2005, June 25−26, 2012, and June 28, 2018.
- The All-time record low: −29 °F (−34 °C) on January 9, 1875
- Lowest daily maximum: −10 °F (−23 °C) on February 3, 1883
- Highest daily minimum: 77 °F (25 °C) on July 3, 1881
- Highest daily average: 88 °F (31 °C) on June 26, 2012
- Lowest daily average: −17 °F (−27 °C) on January 11, 1963
- Highest 24-hour precipitation: 6.50 in (165.1 mm) on May 22, 1876.
- Highest monthly precipitation: 8.57 in (218 mm) during May 1876
- Lowest monthly precipitation: none during December 1881; trace monthly precipitation has occurred several times, the last being November 1949.
- Highest annual precipitation: 23.31 in (592 mm) during 1967
- Lowest annual precipitation: 7.48 in (190 mm) during 2002
- Highest 24-hour snowfall: 23.6 in (59.9 cm) on December 24, 1982
- Highest one-storm total: 45.7 in (116.1 cm) from December 1−6, 1913.
- Highest daily snow depth (since 1921): 26 in (66 cm) November 4−5, 1946
- Highest monthly snowfall: 57.4 in (145.8 cm) during December 1913
- Highest seasonal snowfall: 118.7 in (301.5 cm) during 1908−09
- Lowest seasonal snowfall: 20.8 in (52.8 cm) during 1888−89

=== Climate data ===
Climate data for Denver (DIA; elev 5414 ft), 1991−2020 normals, (Note: Mean monthly maxima and minima (i.e. the highest and lowest temperature readings during an entire month or year) calculated based on data at said location from 1991 to 2020.) extremes 1872−present (Note: The official weather records for Denver were recorded in Downtown Denver from January 1872 to December 1949, at Stapleton International Airport from January 1950 to February 1995, and at Denver International Airport since March 1995.)
Month	Jan	Feb	Mar	Apr	May	Jun	Jul	Aug	Sep	Oct	Nov	Dec	Year
Record high °F (°C)	76 (24)	80 (27)	87 (31)	90 (32)	95 (35)	105 (41)	105 (41)	105 (41)	101 (38)	90 (32)	83 (28)	79 (26)	105 (41)
Mean maximum °F (°C)	65.0 (18.3)	67.1 (19.5)	74.7 (23.7)	80.8 (27.1)	88.3 (31.3)	96.5 (35.8)	99.6 (37.6)	96.9 (36.1)	92.9 (33.8)	84.1 (28.9)	73.6 (23.1)	65.3 (18.5)	100.6 (38.1)
Mean daily maximum °F (°C)	44.6 (7.0)	45.7 (7.6)	55.7 (13.2)	61.7 (16.5)	71.2 (21.8)	83.4 (28.6)	89.9 (32.2)	87.5 (30.8)	79.6 (26.4)	65.3 (18.5)	52.9 (11.6)	44.0 (6.7)	65.1 (18.4)
Daily mean °F (°C)	31.7 (−0.2)	32.7 (0.4)	41.6 (5.3)	47.8 (8.8)	57.4 (14.1)	68.2 (20.1)	75.1 (23.9)	72.9 (22.7)	64.8 (18.2)	51.1 (10.6)	39.4 (4.1)	31.2 (−0.4)	51.2 (10.6)
Mean daily minimum °F (°C)	18.7 (−7.4)	19.7 (−6.8)	27.5 (−2.5)	33.9 (1.1)	43.6 (6.4)	53.0 (11.7)	60.2 (15.7)	58.3 (14.6)	50.0 (10.0)	37.0 (2.8)	26.0 (−3.3)	18.4 (−7.6)	37.2 (2.9)
Mean minimum °F (°C)	−3.8 (−19.9)	−1.5 (−18.6)	9.5 (−12.5)	19.8 (−6.8)	30.2 (−1.0)	41.9 (5.5)	51.4 (10.8)	48.8 (9.3)	35.9 (2.2)	19.6 (−6.9)	5.4 (−14.8)	−3.4 (−19.7)	−11.0 (−23.9)
Record low °F (°C)	−29 (−34)	−25 (−32)	−11 (−24)	−2 (−19)	19 (−7)	30 (−1)	42 (6)	40 (4)	17 (−8)	−2 (−19)	−18 (−28)	−25 (−32)	−29 (−34)
Average precipitation inches (mm)	0.38 (9.7)	0.41 (10)	0.86 (22)	1.68 (43)	2.16 (55)	1.94 (49)	2.14 (54)	1.58 (40)	1.35 (34)	0.99 (25)	0.64 (16)	0.35 (8.9)	14.48 (368)
Average snowfall inches (cm)	6.4 (16)	7.6 (19)	8.8 (22)	6.2 (16)	1.4 (3.6)	0.0 (0.0)	0.0 (0.0)	0.0 (0.0)	0.8 (2.0)	3.9 (9.9)	7.3 (19)	6.6 (17)	49.0 (124)
Average extreme snow depth inches (cm)	3.8 (9.7)	4.7 (12)	4.0 (10)	2.2 (5.6)	0.5 (1.3)	0.0 (0.0)	0.0 (0.0)	0.0 (0.0)	0.1 (0.25)	2.0 (5.1)	4.1 (10)	5.3 (13)	9.0 (23)
Average precipitation days (≥ 0.01 in)	4.4	5.5	6.2	9.0	10.4	8.1	8.3	7.5	6.0	5.3	4.6	4.4	79.7
Average snowy days (≥ 0.1 in)	5.0	5.3	4.8	4.1	0.8	0.0	0.0	0.0	0.4	1.8	4.6	4.6	31.4
Average relative humidity (%)	55.2	55.8	53.7	49.6	51.7	49.3	47.8	49.3	50.1	49.2	56.3	56.6	52.0
Average dew point °F (°C)	12.7 (−10.7)	16.2 (−8.8)	19.9 (−6.7)	26.2 (−3.2)	35.8 (2.1)	43.5 (6.4)	48.4 (9.1)	47.7 (8.7)	39.6 (4.2)	28.6 (−1.9)	21.0 (−6.1)	14.2 (−9.9)	29.5 (−1.4)
Mean monthly sunshine hours	215.3	211.1	255.6	276.2	290.0	315.3	325.0	306.4	272.3	249.2	194.3	195.9	3,106.6
Mean daily daylight hours	9.7	10.7	12.0	13.3	14.4	15.0	14.7	13.7	12.4	11.1	10.0	9.4	12.2
Percentage possible sunshine	72	70	69	69	65	70	71	72	73	72	65	67	70
Average ultraviolet index	2	2	3	3	5	6	6	5	5	3	2	2	4
Source 1: NOAA (sun, relative humidity and dew point 1961−1990)
Source 2: Weather Atlas (Daylight-Average UV index)

Climate data for Denver Water Department (elevation 5225 ft), 1991–2020 normals, extremes 1997–present
Month	Jan	Feb	Mar	Apr	May	Jun	Jul	Aug	Sep	Oct	Nov	Dec	Year
Record high °F (°C)	77 (25)	78 (26)	85 (29)	91 (33)	99 (37)	107 (42)	108 (42)	104 (40)	102 (39)	90 (32)	84 (29)	76 (24)	108 (42)
Mean daily maximum °F (°C)	48.5 (9.2)	49.0 (9.4)	57.9 (14.4)	64.1 (17.8)	73.0 (22.8)	85.3 (29.6)	91.4 (33.0)	89.6 (32.0)	81.6 (27.6)	67.6 (19.8)	55.9 (13.3)	47.3 (8.5)	67.6 (19.8)
Mean daily minimum °F (°C)	21.3 (−5.9)	21.7 (−5.7)	29.6 (−1.3)	36.2 (2.3)	45.9 (7.7)	55.8 (13.2)	61.8 (16.6)	60.1 (15.6)	50.7 (10.4)	37.7 (3.2)	27.6 (−2.4)	20.6 (−6.3)	39.1 (4.0)
Record low °F (°C)	−15 (−26)	−14 (−26)	−2 (−19)	8 (−13)	20 (−7)	36 (2)	49 (9)	40 (4)	22 (−6)	4 (−16)	−8 (−22)	−13 (−25)	−15 (−26)
Average precipitation inches (mm)	0.43 (11)	0.60 (15)	1.13 (29)	1.98 (50)	2.65 (67)	1.73 (44)	1.90 (48)	1.81 (46)	1.20 (30)	1.16 (29)	0.78 (20)	0.48 (12)	15.85 (401)
Average snowfall inches (cm)	5.5 (14)	8.4 (21)	9.2 (23)	5.0 (13)	0.9 (2.3)	0 (0)	0 (0)	0 (0)	0 (0)	2.5 (6.4)	4.4 (11)	4.8 (12)	40.7 (102.7)
Source: xmACIS2

Climate data for Central Park, Denver, 1991–2020 normals
Month	Jan	Feb	Mar	Apr	May	Jun	Jul	Aug	Sep	Oct	Nov	Dec	Year
Mean daily maximum °F (°C)	46.5 (8.1)	47.5 (8.6)	56.4 (13.6)	62.5 (16.9)	71.7 (22.1)	84.1 (28.9)	90.2 (32.3)	87.9 (31.1)	80.1 (26.7)	66.7 (19.3)	54.8 (12.7)	45.9 (7.7)	66.2 (19.0)
Mean daily minimum °F (°C)	17.6 (−8.0)	19.3 (−7.1)	27.1 (−2.7)	33.7 (0.9)	43.4 (6.3)	52.9 (11.6)	59.3 (15.2)	57.2 (14.0)	48.2 (9.0)	35.7 (2.1)	25.5 (−3.6)	17.7 (−7.9)	36.5 (2.5)
Average precipitation inches (mm)	0.46 (12)	0.53 (13)	1.12 (28)	1.67 (42)	2.29 (58)	1.68 (43)	2.12 (54)	1.83 (46)	1.51 (38)	0.98 (25)	0.70 (18)	0.47 (12)	15.36 (390)
Average snowfall inches (cm)	6.4 (16)	7.6 (19)	8.8 (22)	6.2 (16)	1.4 (3.6)	0 (0)	0 (0)	0 (0)	0.8 (2.0)	3.9 (9.9)	7.3 (19)	6.6 (17)	49.0 (124)
Source: NOAA

Climate data for Denver
Month	Jan	Feb	Mar	Apr	May	Jun	Jul	Aug	Sep	Oct	Nov	Dec	Year
Mean daily daylight hours	10.0	11.0	12.0	13.0	14.0	15.0	15.0	14.0	12.0	11.0	10.0	9.0	12.2
Average Ultraviolet index	2	3	5	7	9	11	11	10	7	5	3	2	6.2
See or edit raw graph data.	Source: Weather Atlas												

== Neighborhoods ==
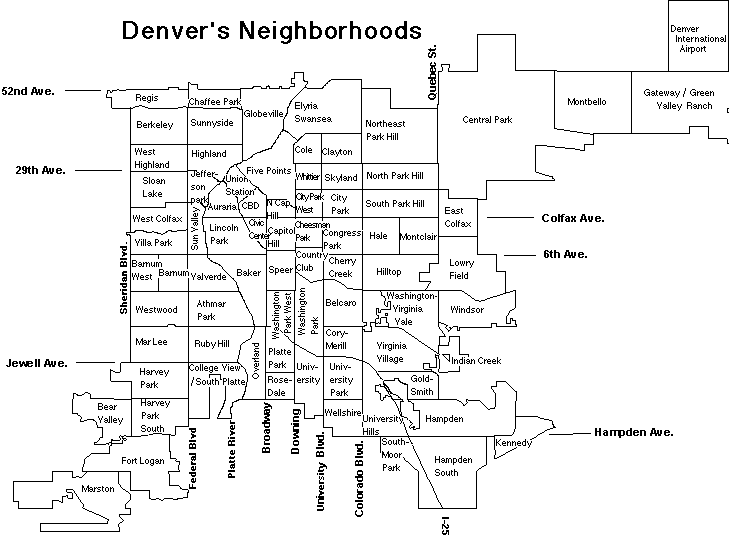
Denver's 79 neighborhoods offer a variety of living experiences.

Denver has 79 neighborhoods that the City and community groups use for planning and administration. Although the City's delineation of the neighborhood boundaries is somewhat arbitrary, the City's definitions of its neighborhoods roughly correspond to those used by residents.

Denver also has a number of neighborhoods not reflected in the City's administrative neighborhoods. Sometimes these neighborhoods reflect the way people in an area identify themselves; sometimes they reflect how others, such as real estate developers, have defined those areas.

Among the neighborhoods commonly spoken of are historic and trendy LoDo (short for "Lower Downtown"), part of the City's Union Station neighborhood; Capitol Hill, Washington Park; Uptown, part of the North Capitol Hill neighborhood; Curtis Park, part of the Five Points neighborhood; Alamo Placita, the northern part of the Speer neighborhood; and the Golden Triangle, roughly the Civic Center neighborhood.

== Transportation ==
=== Grid system ===
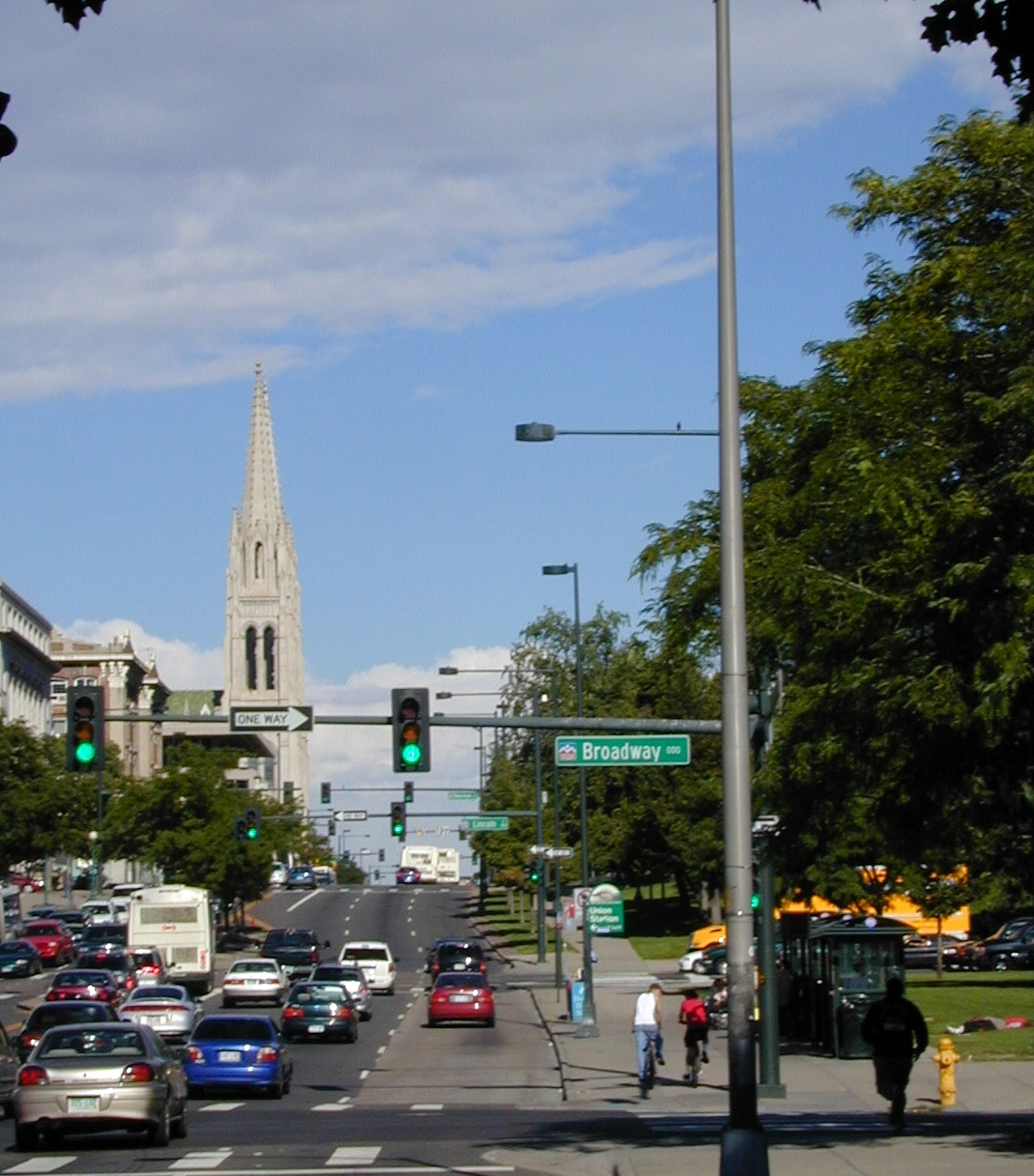
Colfax Ave at Broadway, where the downtown and the normal city grid meet

Most of Denver has a straightforward street grid oriented to the four cardinal directions. Blocks are usually identified in hundreds from the median streets, identified as "0", which are Broadway (the west-east median) and Ellsworth Avenue (the north-south median). Colfax Avenue, the major east-west artery through Denver, is 15 blocks (1500 North) of the median. Avenues north of Ellsworth are numbered (except for Colfax Avenue and a few others), while avenues south of Ellsworth are named.

There is also an older downtown grid system that was designed to be parallel to the confluence of the South Platte River and Cherry Creek. Most of the streets downtown and in LoDo run northeast-southwest and northwest-southeast. This system has an unplanned benefit for snow removal; if the streets were in a normal N-S/E-W grid, only the N-S streets would get sun. With the grid pointed in diagonal directions, the NW-SE streets get the sun to melt snow in the morning and the NE-SW streets get it in the afternoon. The NW-SE streets are numbered, while the NE-SW streets are named. The named streets start at the intersection of Colfax Avenue and Broadway with the block-long Cheyenne Place. The numbered streets start underneath the Colfax and I-25 viaducts. There are 27 named and 44 numbered streets on this grid. There are also a few vestiges of the old grid system in the normal grid, such as Park Avenue, Morrison Road, and Speer Boulevard.

=== Highways ===
Denver is primarily served by the interstate highways I-25 and I-70. The intersection of the two interstates is referred to locally as "the mousetrap." I-70 runs east-west from Utah to Baltimore, Maryland. I-25 runs north-south from the New Mexico border through Denver to Buffalo, Wyoming. I-225 traverses neighboring Aurora and connects with I-25 in the southeastern corner of Denver. Additionally, I-76 begins from I-70 on the south edge of the city of Arvada. It intersects I-25 north of the city and runs northeast to Nebraska where it ends at I-80. U.S. Highway 6 connects downtown Denver to the suburb of Golden.

A highway expansion and transit project, dubbed "T-REX", was recently completed along the I-25 corridor. The project included the addition of extra freeway lanes, the redesign of several highway overpasses, and a light rail line along the I-25 corridor between downtown Denver and the Denver Technological Center. The massive project was finished in the Fall of 2006, ahead of schedule and under budget.

=== Public transit ===
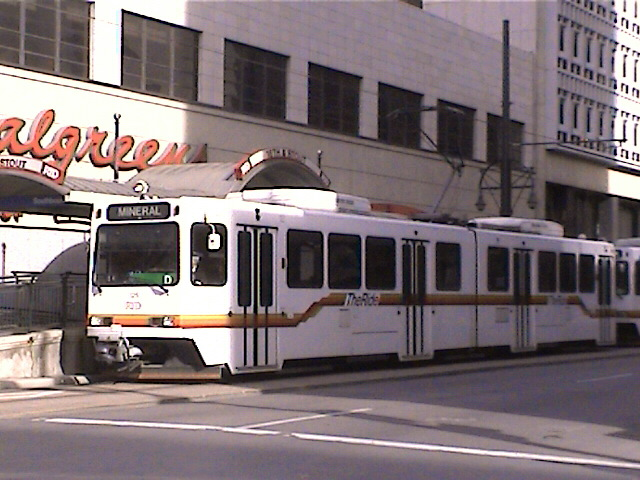
Denver RTD Light Rail car at 16th & Stout

Mass transportation throughout the Denver-Aurora metropolitan area is managed and coordinated by the Regional Transportation District (RTD). RTD currently operates more than 1,000 buses serving 10,000 bus stops in 38 municipal jurisdictions. Additionally, RTD operates seven light rail lines (the C Line, D Line, E Line, F Line, H Line, R Line, and the W Line) as well as two commuter rail lines serving a total of 53 stations. The current RTD local fare is $2.25. FasTracks, an expansion project approved by voters in 2004, will allow the light rail to serve cities such as Lakewood, Golden, and Aurora. Commuter rail lines will serve Boulder, Longmont, and the Denver International Airport, augmenting existing light rail extending from the downtown area to C-470 servicing the Denver suburbs.

=== Inter-city rail ===
Passenger train service to Denver is provided by Amtrak's California Zephyr, which runs from Chicago to the San Francisco Bay Area with major stops in Omaha, Denver, Salt Lake City, and Reno. Additionally, the Winter Park Express provides winter weekend service from Denver to Winter Park Resort. Both trains stop at Denver's historic Union Station, where travelers can transfer to RTD's 16th Street Free MallRide or use light rail to tour the city.

=== Airports ===
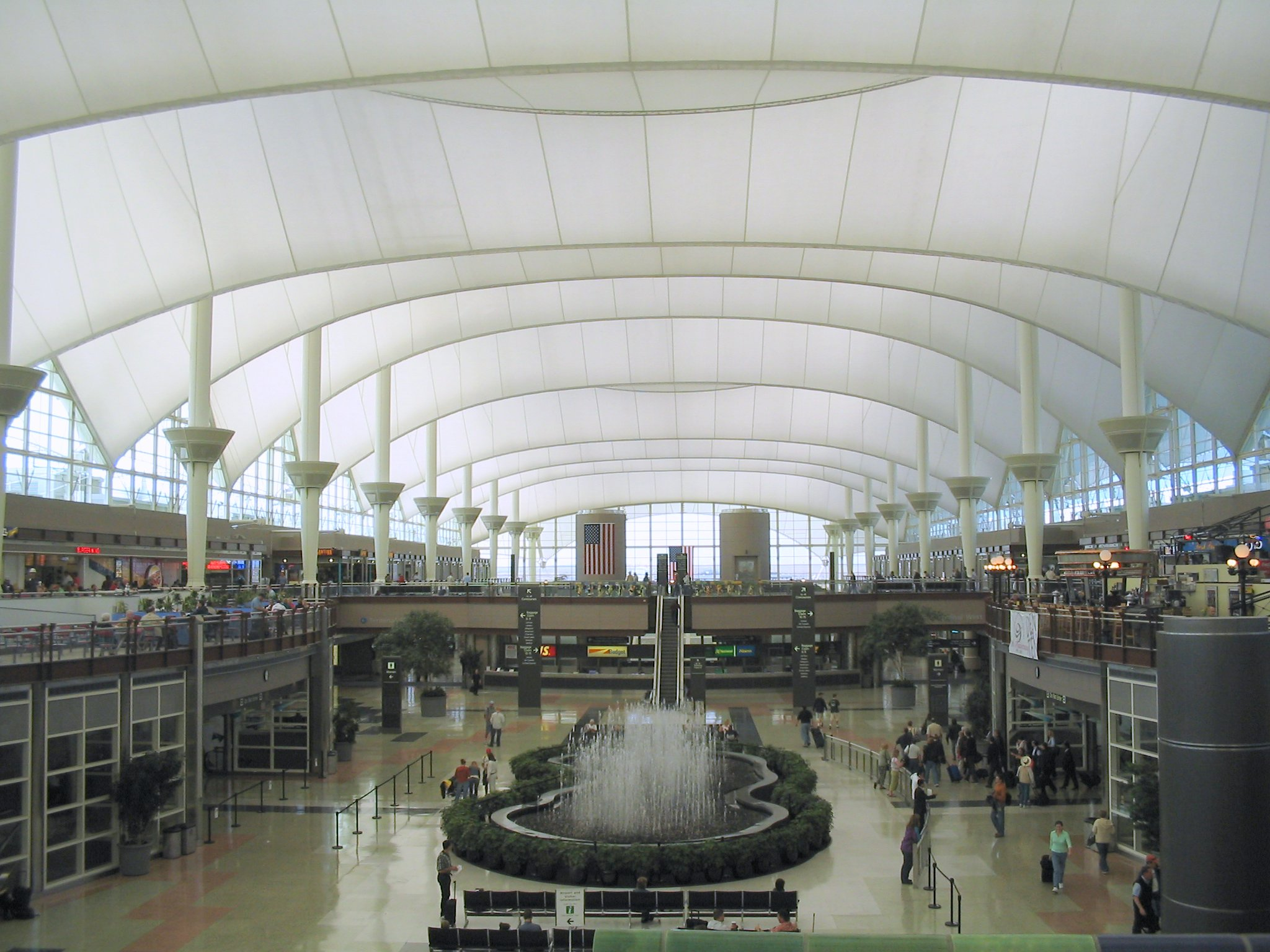
Denver International Airport

- Denver International Airport is the eleventh busiest airport in the world, and sixth in the U.S. In 2005, it handled 43.4 million passengers. In land area it is the largest airport in the United States, covering 53 sq. miles.
- Formerly Stapleton International Airport (replaced by Denver International Airport and closed in 1995)
- Formerly Lowry Air Force Base (flights stopped around 1965)
