= Whittier, Denver =

Neighborhood in Denver, Colorado

Coordinates: 39.7572°N 104.9666°W

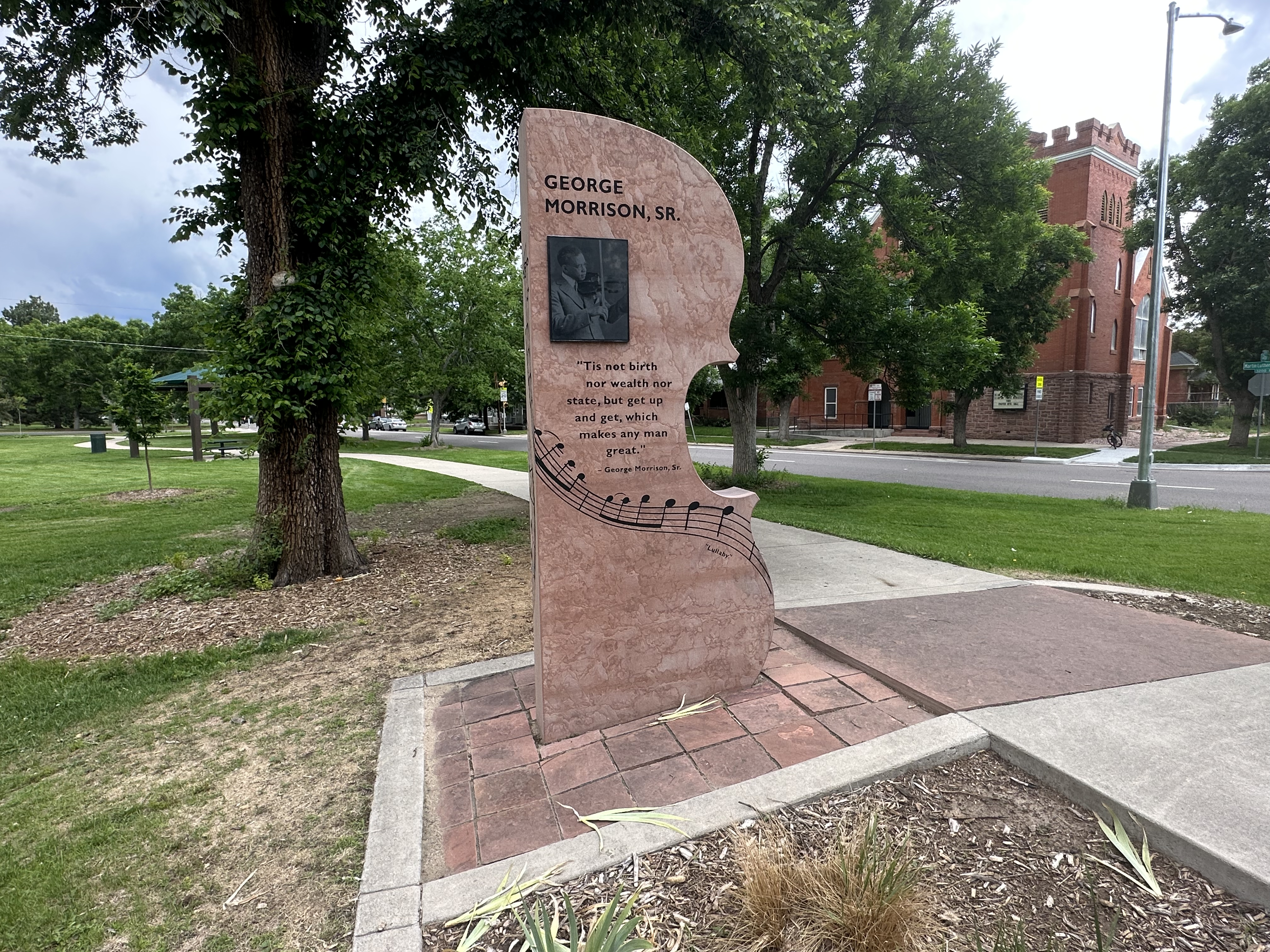
Monument to George Morrison, Sr. in his titular park on the Northern border of Whittier. “Tis not birth, nor wealth, nor state, but get up and get which makes any man great.”

Whittier is a neighborhood of Denver, Colorado, located approximately two miles northeast of downtown Denver. The boundaries of the neighborhood are 23rd Avenue to the south, Martin Luther King Boulevard (32nd) to the north, Downing St. to the west and York St. to the east. The neighborhood is mostly residential and old (1890s) by standards of the cities of the American West. Most of the housing stock was built prior to the 1940s.

The neighborhood is named for an elementary school located at 25th Avenue and Downing St. which was named after John Greenleaf Whittier (1807-1892), an abolitionist poet and a founding member of the American Republican political party. Given the philosophy of Whittier, the neighborhood was ethnically integrated from its inception.

Today, the Whittier neighborhood is ethnically diverse with Blacks, Hispanics, and Whites composing the population. A combination of proximity to downtown, parks and a public golf course in addition to a housing stock of early twentieth century homes of craftsman architecture at reasonable prices is driving an influx of young professionals and their families to the Whittier neighborhood.

== Notable people ==
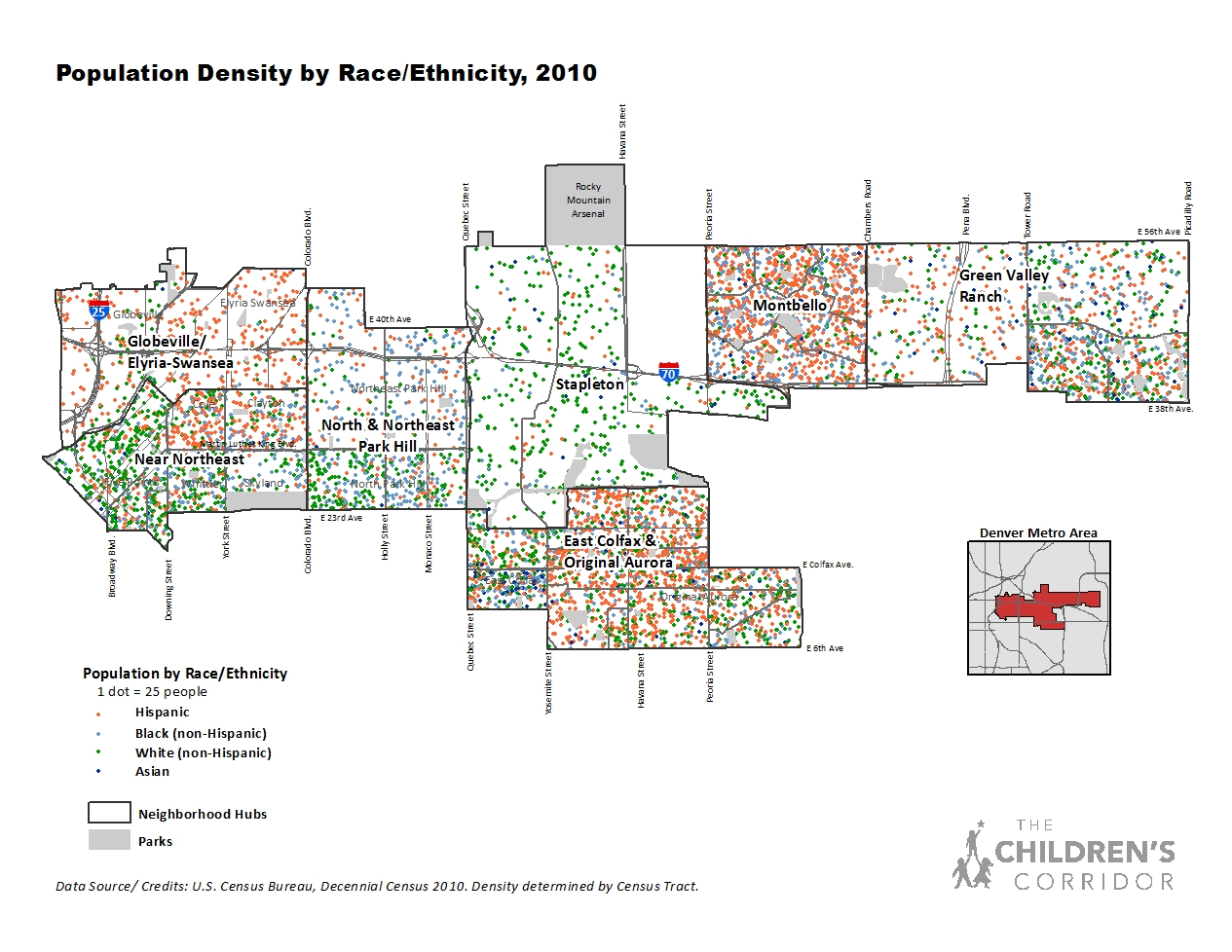
Denver population density by race-ethnicity, 2010

- Bob Ragland (1938 – 2021) artist, teacher, television host, author, and activist. The nearby Bob Ragland branch of the Denver Public Library is named after him.

== See also ==
- Bibliography of Colorado
- Geography of Colorado
- History of Colorado
- Index of Colorado-related articles
- List of Colorado-related lists
  - List of neighborhoods in Denver
  - List of populated places in Colorado
- Outline of Colorado
