= Bob Ragland =

American artist (1938–2021)

- Born: Robert L. Ragland; December 11, 1938; Cleveland, Ohio
- Died: April 10, 2021 (aged 82)
- Occupations: Artist, teacher, author, activist, television host
- Known for: Namesake for Bob Ragland branch of the Denver Public Library

Bob Ragland (December 11, 1938 – April 10, 2021) was an artist and teacher based in Denver, Colorado. He is best known for his oil paintings and his found object sculptures, as well as his practical "Non-Starving Artist" philosophy. The Bob Ragland Branch of the Denver Public Library is named in his honor.

== Early life and education ==
Robert L. "Bob" Ragland was born in 1938 in Cleveland, Ohio, to Carey and Violet Ragland. His parents were from Georgia and Alabama, respectively, and had moved north during the Great Migration.

At age 18, he enlisted in the U.S. Army, which brought him to Colorado's Fort Carson. The state would become his longtime home. In 1959, after completing his military service, he settled in Denver, where he worked for the U.S. Postal Service and produced advertising materials for a local business.

While in Denver, Ragland began to study art at the Rocky Mountain School of Art. He also attended the Emily Griffith Opportunity School, where he learned to weld.

== Career ==
As an artist, Ragland worked across various mediums, including painting, drawing, and sculpture. He made cartoons, jewelry, and more, but he is perhaps best known for his oil on masonite panels and sculptures using found objects.

Several of his pieces, including "Flute Player With Corn Row Hair" (1990), are in the collection of Denver's Kirkland Museum. President Jimmy Carter and Colorado Lt. Gov. George L. Brown were among those who commissioned pieces by Ragland throughout his career. He exhibited his work widely beginning in 1964, and he was known for regularly mounting shows on the porch of his home in Denver's Whittier neighborhood.

Ragland also taught art, including at the Denver Public Schools Career Education Center, where he ran what he dubbed the "Non-Starving Artist Program." The program focused on teaching practical skills to make life as a working artist possible, such as marketing and networking. His often-repeated mantra reflected his view that artists had to be realistic about making a living: "Bread and shelter has to be paid for, I’ve got to heat and eat." He also taught at the Emily Griffith Opportunity School, George Washington High School, and Bradley Elementary.

In the 1980s, he wrote two books about his philosophy as an artist: The Artist's Question and Answer Book and The Artist's Survival Handbook (or, What to Do Till You're Rich and Famous). In the 1970s, Ragland hosted the show "You're an Artist" on Rocky Mountain PBS.

Ragland was involved in community activism in his Denver neighborhood, particularly in the 1960s and '70s, when he was active with the East Side Action Center.

== Personal life, death, and legacy ==
Bob Ragland and his wife had three sons and several grandchildren.

Ragland died in April 2021 at the age of 82. A frequent Denver Public Library user, he was selected the following year as the namesake for the new Bob Ragland Branch Library, which has a focus on community arts. A portrait of Ragland by fellow artist and friend Dean Mitchell has been displayed at the Smithsonian's National Portrait Gallery.
