= Thomas L. Carr =

American archaeologist & photographer (born 1964)

Thomas Carr (born July 17, 1964) is an American archaeologist and photographer who has studied the intersection of anthropology and art with an emphasis on the abandonment of human built environments in the natural landscape. His academic work has been published in journals such as Archaeological Prospection and Colorado Heritage Magazine. He has lectured extensively on archaeology, photography, visual ethnography, and historic preservation. His photographic work in the Rocky Mountains region has been the subject of several major exhibitions and numerous group and juried exhibitions. The Western History and Genealogy Department of the Denver Public Library holds a collection of Carr's photographs in its permanent archives.

== Early life and education ==
Thomas Lee Carr was born on July 17, 1964, in Toledo, Ohio to Thomas Foster Carr and Marion Lee Carr. The family moved to Charlotte, North Carolina in 1974.

In 1979 Carr joined the Light Factory, a photographic arts education organization in Charlotte. In 1981 and 1982 a number of his early works were exhibited in Scholastic Arts exhibitions, and he received several Gold Key awards and a nomination for the Kodak Medallion of Excellence. In 1982 Carr was recognized by the National Endowment for Advancement in the Arts (dbi YoungArts) as a Promising Young Artist in Visual Arts.

From 1984 to 1992 Carr attended undergraduate college at the University of North Carolina at Charlotte and studied photography and anthropology. During this time, he participated in numerous photography exhibitions and held his first solo exhibition in 1984 titled Winter Scenes from McAlpine Park at the Queens College (now Queens University of Charlotte). A profile of Carr and his photographic work was the subject of a feature article in the spring 1985 edition of Sanskrit Magazine.

From 1993 to 1996 Carr attended graduate college at the University of Colorado at Boulder and earned a Master of Arts in Anthropology. Carr's MA thesis was published in 1996 in the international peer review journal "Archaeological Prospection". The results of the research received national and international press coverage, including articles in the Denver Post, Earth Magazine, and the Christian Science Monitor.

== Career ==
=== Archaeology ===
After receiving his MA in 1996, Carr worked on a variety of archaeological projects in Idaho, Indiana, Missouri, Montana, New Mexico, Oregon, and Utah. He also served as the instructor of record for courses in North American Archaeology and Archaeological Methods at the University of Colorado at Boulder.

From 2001 to 2015 Carr worked as a staff archaeologist with State Historical Society of Colorado (dba History Colorado). During this time, he worked on a number of archaeological projects and continued to photograph significant historical places and natural landscapes.

Around 2008 Carr undertook a study of his own personal history, title Excavating Childhood: the archaeology of self. It started with the discovery of buried toys in the backyard of his childhood home in North Carolina that Carr had purposely buried in the 1970s when he was a teenager. Carr had forgotten about the toys until their discovery. He used these various toy artifacts to create works of art and wrote several professional archaeological papers about the experience. In 2015, he was invited to write an article for Colorado Heritage Magazine and his story was featured on Colorado Public Radio.

Since 2021, Carr works as the Cultural Resource Team Lead/Senior Archaeologist for AECOM.

=== Film ===
Between 1998 and 2000 Carr produced and directed an ethnohistoric film titled A Forgotten Place. The subject of the film was the Robinson Rock House Ruin and Plantation Site at the Reedy Creek Park, in Mecklenburg County, North Carolina. The emphasis of the film was an effort to understand the process by which historic places are abandoned and rediscovered. The film was premiered in 2000 at the Charlotte Museum of History. The film was subsequently screened at two film festivals - the 2003 Kineon 5th International Festival of Archaeological Film, Brussels, Belgium, and in 2004, at the Archaeology Channel International Film Festival, Eugene, Oregon. The film was also purchased by a number of university libraries and anthropology departments for educational purposes. The film continues to be hosted by The Archaeology Channel's web-streaming site.

In 2016 Carr was invited by YoungArts to participate in a collaborative art project called Transformations. Carr collaborated with filmmaker Kayla Briët and animator/dancer Isabela Dos Santos. Their film was titled Solitude, Darkness, Light, and was premiered in Miami, Florida.

In 2017 and 2018 the film was screened at a number of film festivals including NFFTY 2017 in Seattle, Washington, Sans Souci Festival of Dance in Cinema 2017 in Boulder, Colorado, the 2018 Durango Independent Film Festival in Durango, Colorado, the 2018 Solaris Film Festival in Nice, France. In 2017, two of Carr's images from the film were included in a YoungArts photography alumni exhibition title "Enlighted".

=== Photography ===
Around 2002 Carr, joined the Colorado Photographic Arts Center in Denver, Colorado, where he served as a board member from 2006 to 2008. The Center also holds one of his photographs in its permanent collection. In 2003 he was invited to write an article for Colorado Heritage Magazine about the common histories of archaeology and photography. The magazine also featured a portfolio of his photography. In 2004 he was invited to exhibit his photographic work at the Center of Southwest Studies, Fort Lewis College, Durango, Colorado. The exhibit was titled Presence Within Abandonment: Photography, Archaeology, and Western Historic Sites and went on to be hosted at the Farmington Museum, in Farmington, New Mexico in 2005, and the Canyons of the Ancients National Monument Visitor Center, in Dolores, Colorado, in 2006. Various local newspapers reviewed the exhibition, including an article by photo historian Judith Reynolds in the Durango Herald. Carr was invited to write another article and associated photo essay for Colorado Heritage Magazine in the spring of 2005 about the World War II era Japanese American internment camp in Colorado known as Amache. Also in 2005, the Dairy Arts Center in Boulder, Colorado, hosted an exhibition of Carr's portfolio from Scotland titled Farmers, Saints, and Tyrants.

In 2006 Carr co-curated an exhibition of vintage photographs chronicling the history of Mesa Verde National Park. The exhibit was titled From Nordenskiold to Nusbaum: photography, archaeology, and tourism in the early years of Mesa Verde National Park and was held in the Western Art Gallery of the Central Denver Public Library. The exhibit was highlighted in several newspapers, including the Rocky Mountain News. Carr also wrote an accompanying article for Colorado Heritage Magazine. The exhibit also won a Best of Denver award from Westword Magazine. Also in 2006, and in association with the celebration of the 100th anniversary of the Antiquities Act, Carr was invited by the University of Denver Museum of Anthropology to exhibit his portfolio of photographs taken at Ancestral Puebloan archaeological sites in the Southwestern United States.

In 2007 Carr was invited to create a series of photographs for an exhibition at the Mizel Museum of Denver, Colorado. The exhibit was titled 10 "Glocal" Artists Interpret Genocide and centered around the exploration of ethnohistoric photography and contemporary documentation of sites on the Great Plains of the western United States. Carr's series was titled Conflict on the Plains and went on to be exhibited at the Town Hall Arts Center, Littleton, Colorado, in 2009, and the Ute Indian Museum, Montrose, Colorado, in 2017. In 2016 Carr was invited to share a selection of images from this portfolio in the online magazine SAPIENS.

In 2015 Carr was invited to hold a major retrospective exhibition of his historical site photography at the Western Art Gallery of the Central Denver Public Library. The exhibit was titled Thomas Carr: Expeditions, and a review of it was published in 5280 Magazine in July 2015.

From late 2016 to early 2017 Carr had an exhibition of his photography titled Tree and Leaf at the Denver International Airport.

Carr then undertook a visual ethnography study of homelessness as seen through the lens of photography. The project was titled Traces of Home, and the fieldwork was conducted from 2016 to 2018, and involved visiting upwards of 80 homeless camps in the Front Range urban corridor of Colorado. The project resulted in two major exhibitions at the 40-West Arts in Lakewood, Colorado, in 2019 and the University of Denver Museum of Anthropology in 2020.

Most recently, Carr has produced an impressionistic and allegorical representation of his years of exploration as an archaeologist and photographer titled The archaeology of light. Images from this series have been exhibited in a number of juried exhibitions from 2018 to the present, including three prints in the LIES exhibit at the Colorado Photographic Arts Center in 2018, and PHOTO PENSATO at the Sangre de Cristo Arts Center in Pueblo, Colorado in 2023. A blog article about the portfolio by curator Lisa Woodward with the FAR Center for Contemporary Arts was published in July of 2023. In October of 2023, Carr was accepted as an Associate Member of Pirate Contemporary Art in Denver, Colorado.
