= Denver Central Library =

Public library in Denver, Colorado, U.S.

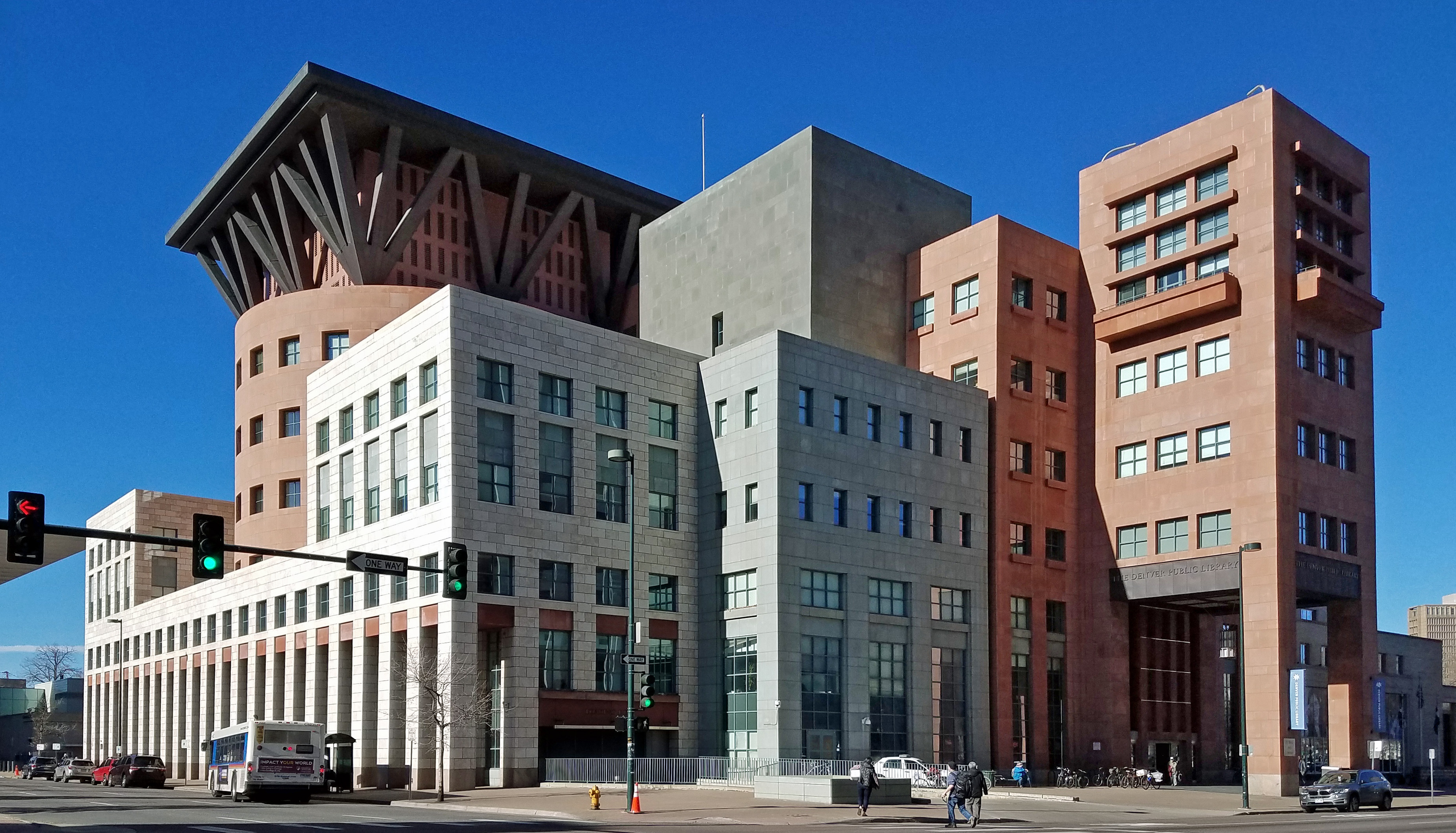
- Denver Central Library in 2017
- 39°44′17″N 104°59′18″W
- Location: Golden Triangle, Denver, Colorado, United States
- Type: Public library
- Architect: Michael Graves
- Branch of: Denver Public Library

Collection
- Items collected: Books, periodicals, digital media, historical photographs
- Size: 2 million items

Other information
- Budget: $91.6 million (Construction cost)
- Parent organization: City and County of Denver
- Public transit access: 16th Street Mall Shuttle
- Website: www.denverlibrary.org

U.S. National Register of Historic Places
- Type: Contributing property
- Designated: 1990
- Part of: Denver Civic Center
- Reference no.: 90001345

The Denver Central Library is the flagship building of the Denver Public Library System. It is located within Downtown Denver's Golden Triangle neighborhood and sits on the south side of Colorado's 16th Street Mall, adjacent to the Denver Art Museum. The postmodern building was designed by architect Michael Graves. Commissioned in 1990 and completed in 1995, it is one of the largest libraries in the United States and receives more than one million visitors each year. It was the venue of the 23rd G8 Summit in 1997.

== History ==
In 1910, the first central library building was opened in Denver. The building took the form of a Greek temple and was located in Civic Center Park. The $430,000 project had been funded by Scottish-American philanthropist Andrew Carnegie and would serve as the main branch library in Denver for over forty years. In 1956, Denver commissioned a new building with the help of Burnam Hoyt. This new building provided more than double the amount of space that the original building has provided. However, due to a rapidly increasing population, a bigger structure would be needed to house Denver's growing collection of books. In 1990, Michael Graves answered the call by designing a new library for the burgeoning city. $91.6 million was allocated towards the project, which would take five years to build. The new library was keen to adopt new technology and featured 180 computers. In 2015, more than 300,00 images were obtained from the now defunct Rocky Mountain News.

=== G8 Summit ===
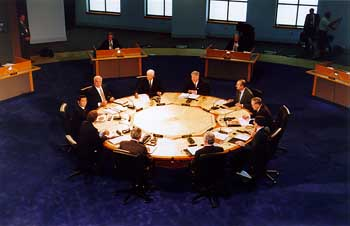
Denver G8 Summit

In 1997, Denver Central Library was the location of the G8 Summit. Leaders at the summit included Jean Chrétien, Boris Yeltsin, Tony Blair, Romano Prodi, Ryutaro Hashimoto, Jacques Santer, Helmut Kohl, Jacques Chirac, and Wim Kok. The appearance of Russia at the conference was particularly significant as it signaled a shift to a freer Russia. Meetings took place inside of the General Reference room, which is located on the first floor of the library. The Summit convened in the library's Vida Ellison gallery on the seventh floor for lunch.

== Architecture ==
The 540,000-square-foot (50,000 m^{2}) post-modern design takes use of traditional post-modern motifs of abstracted classical forms, colors, and materials from the past.
