= Denver City and County Building =

Historic church in Denver, Colorado

- City and County Building
- U.S. Historic district – Contributing property
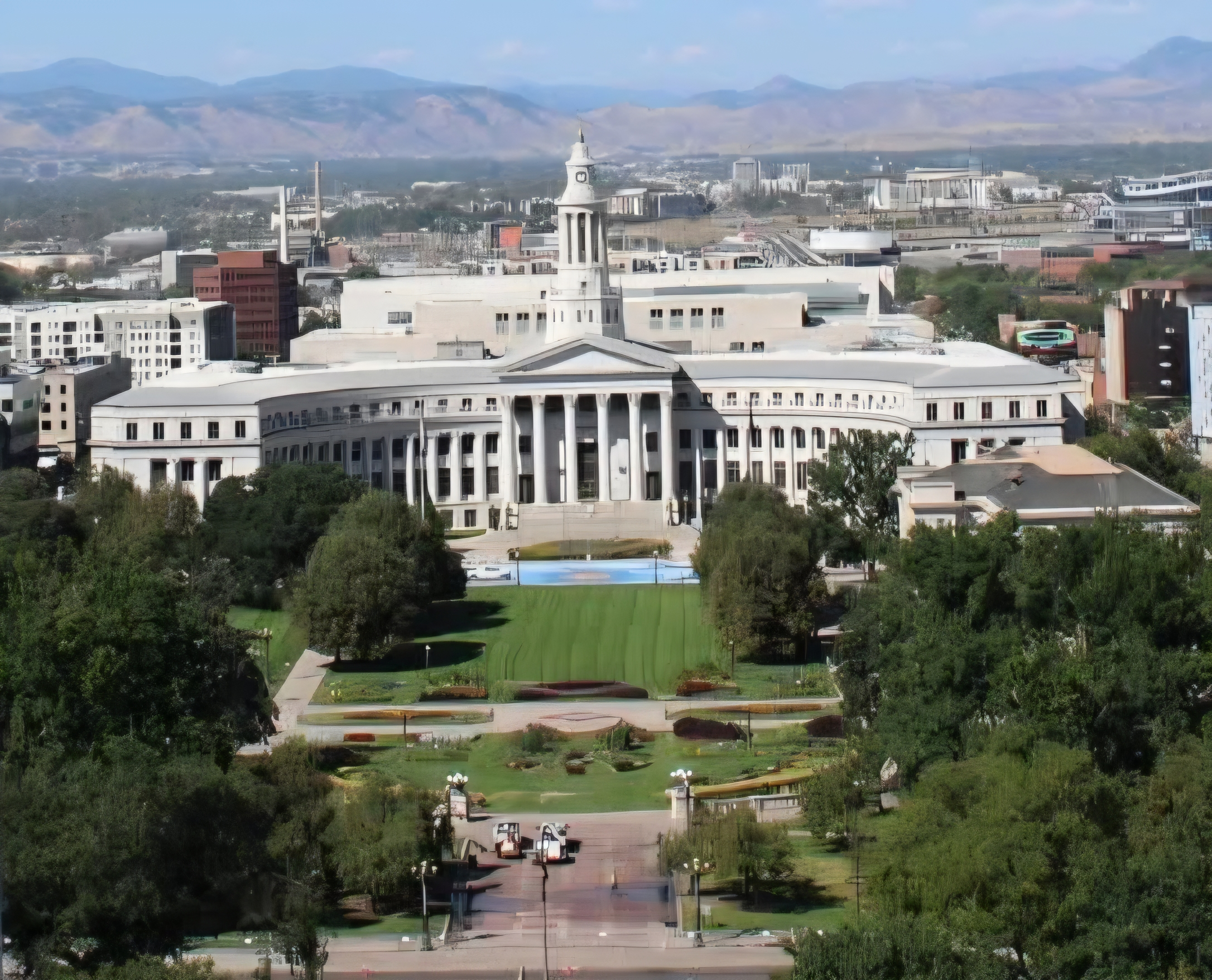

- Location within Colorado Location within the United States
- Interactive map showing the location of Denver City and Council Building
- Location: Denver, Colorado
- Coordinates: 39°44′22″N 104°59′20″W
- Built: 1932; 94 years ago
- Part of: Civic Center Historic District (ID74002348)
- Designated CP: February 27, 1974

Denver's City and County Building is a historic building in the Denver Civic Center, built to house Denver government bureaus.

It was built in 1932, facing the Colorado State Capitol, at the west end of Civic Center Park, at 1437 Bannock Street, on land that had been home to the La Veta Place apartments, home to some of Denver's early high society members, including Louise Sneed Hill. It is Greek Revival in style. It was kept low in height to preserve the Capitol building's view of mountains.

== See also ==
- History of the government of Denver, Colorado
