= Denver Cruiser Ride =

Monthly bicycle ride in Denver, Colorado, US

The Denver Cruiser Ride is a monthly bicycle ride in Denver, Colorado. Originally a weekly event, the ride, which runs from May through September each summer, would attract over two-thousand riders each week. Founded in 2005 by Brad Evans, the ride has grown annually and is known for the weekly themes and meetup, originally at the Greek Amphitheater in Civic Center Park, called the "Circle of Death".

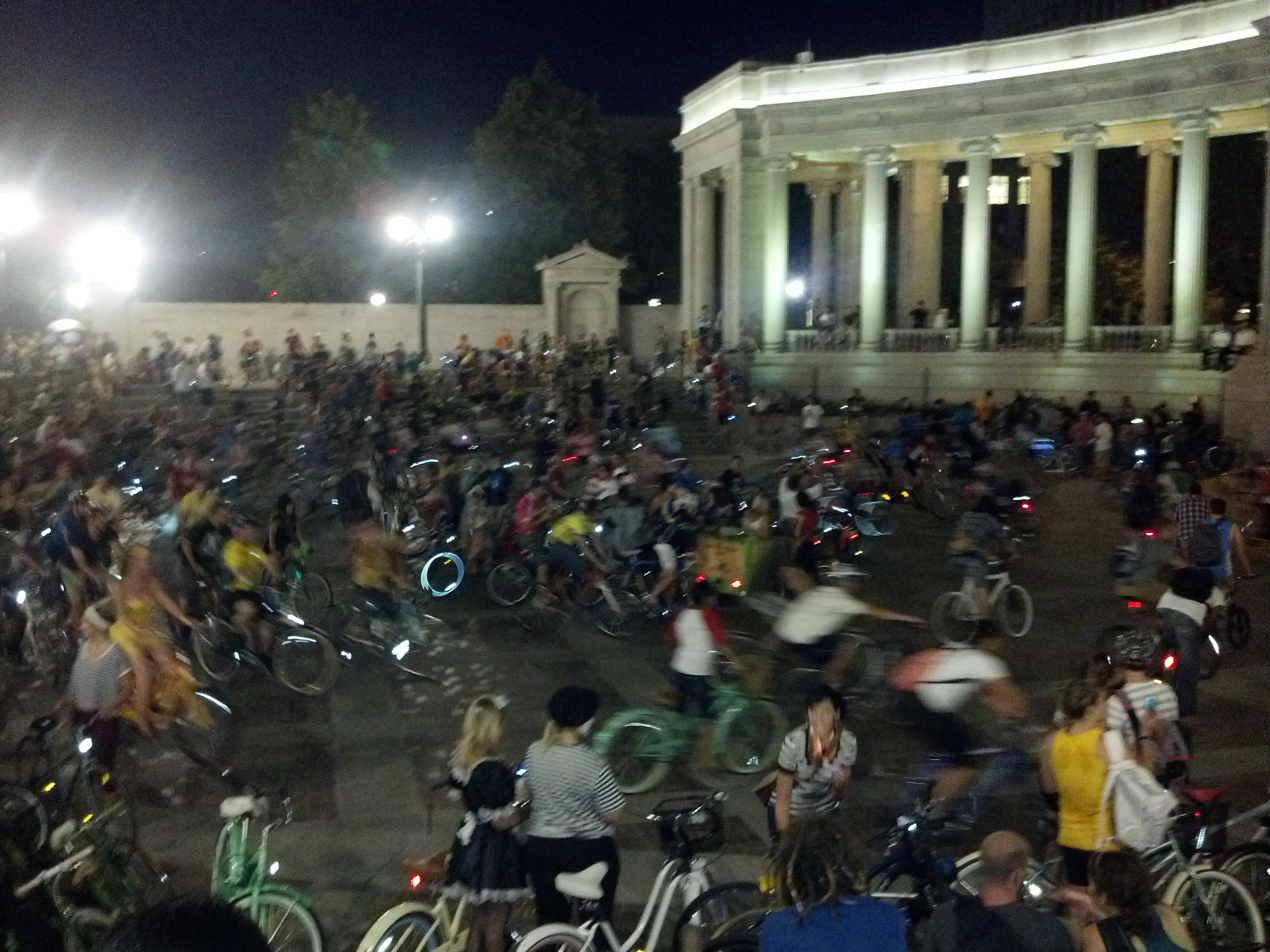
The Circle of Death

== History ==
The Denver Cruiser ride was founded in 2005 by Brad Evans, a Denver bicycle enthusiast. Evans posted the event to Craigslist and shared the idea with friends, creating the weekly Wednesday ride each summer. The first ride attracted 13 participants.

As the ride has grown each summer, it has gained attention from media outlets including television and local print newspapers. The event has also attracted the attention of local Denverites and law enforcement.

In 2017, the weekly ride transitioned to five monthly rides from late spring to early fall. In 2018, the first ride started at the Ginn Mill.

Most riders choose to use a cruiser bicycle, though any bicycle is encouraged. Motorized vehicles are not allowed on cruiser rides.

== Themes ==
Each ride has a theme and riders dress in costumes and decorate their bicycles to match the theme. These have ranges from "superheroes" to more obscure themes such as "Back in Black".
