= Denver Public Library =

Library system in Denver, Colorado, US

- Denver Central Library is listed on the National Register of Historic Places
- 39.737313°N 104.988246°W
- Location: 10 W. 14th Ave., Denver, Colorado, U.S.
- Type: Public library
- Established: 1889; 137 years ago
- Branches: 27

Collection
- Items collected: 2,000,000

Access and use
- Circulation: 9,200,000
- Population served: 660,000

Other information
- Website: www.denverlibrary.org

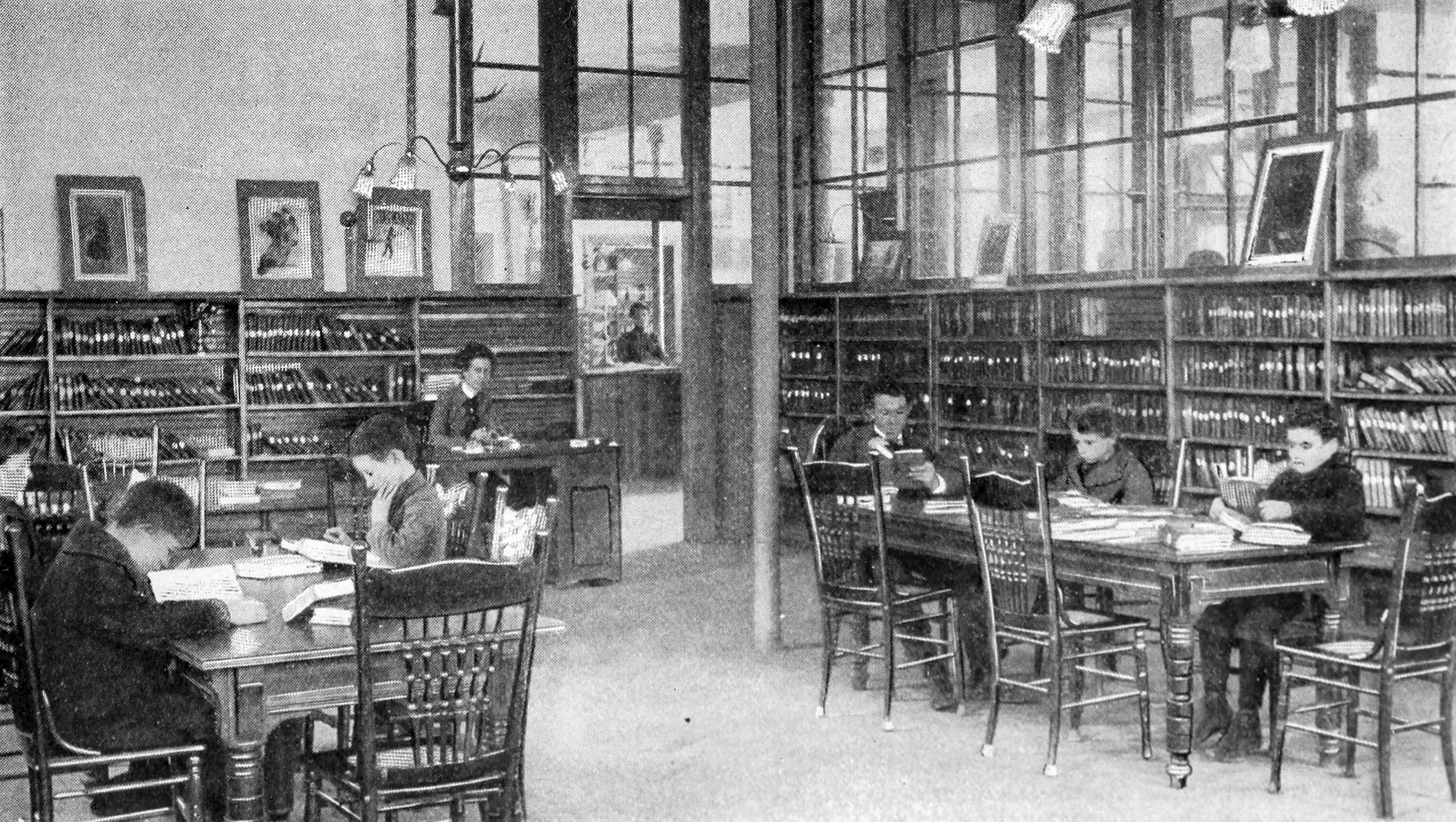
Children's reading room, 1900

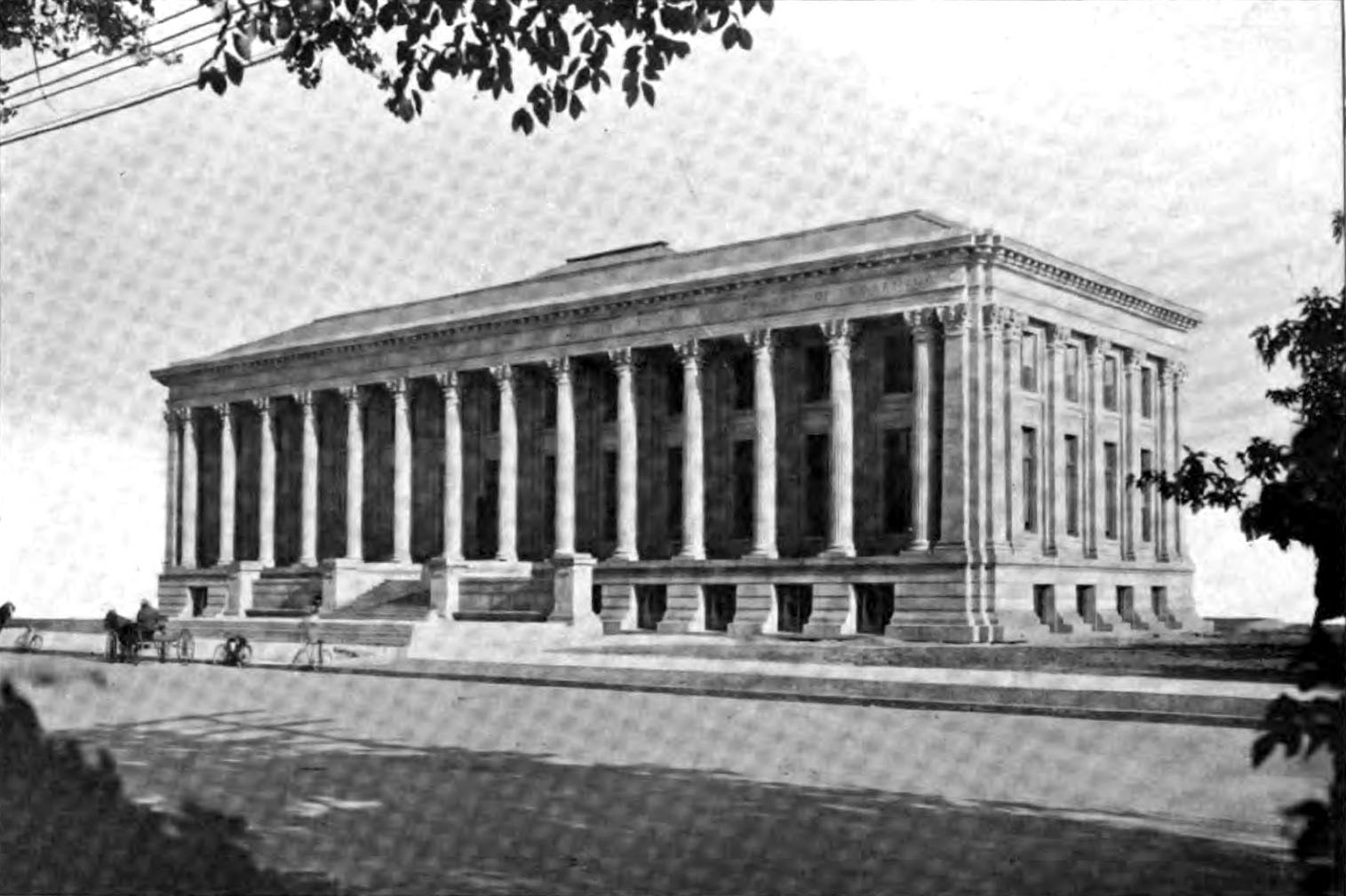
The original 1910 Denver Carnegie library; still stands today as the McNichols Civic Center Building.

Denver Public Library is the public library system of the City and County of Denver, Colorado, United States. The system includes Denver Central Library, located in the Golden Triangle district of Downtown Denver, as well as 28 branch locations and two bookmobiles. The library's collection totals more than 2 million items, including books, reference materials, movies, music, and photographs. Of that total, more than 347,000 items are in specific collections including the Special Collections and Archives, Blair-Caldwell African American Research Library, and Reference Department holdings.

== History ==
The library started in 1859 as an outdoor facility built from a carpenter's bench under a tree. It was founded by Arthur Pierce, one of the pioneers during the gold rush era. The library later evolved from the 1878 donation of books to the city's board of education, which were then maintained in a wing of East Denver High School. John Cotton Dana was named chief librarian and the "Denver Public Library" was officially established in 1889. The library moved into its own building in 1910, a Greek Revival design funded by philanthropist Andrew Carnegie that was located in Civic Center Park downtown. (The 1910 building was repurposed to serve the Board of Water Commissioners for many years, and survives as McNichols Civic Center Building, in the Civic Center Historic District (Denver, Colorado).) Between 1913 and 1920, Carnegie also underwrote construction of the library's first eight branches. Previously the city relied on traveling trunks of books.

=== Central Library ===
In the 1950s the city commissioned the architectural firm Fisher & Fisher and designer Burnham Hoyt to build a new Central Library to be located on Broadway and West 14th Avenue. The property had previously been an auto dealership for the Ford Model T, Model A, and Model B before being condemned by the City in 1953. The Fisher/Hoyt Central Library in the city's Golden Triangle opened in 1956 and was added to the National Register of Historic Places in 1990. As part of the dedication of the new library when it opened, Yale Library loaned a collection of books that included the 1455 Gutenberg Bible and 1640 Bay Psalm Book that are both rare and valuable artifacts. Throughout the 1950s and 1970s, Denver experienced an explosion of growth and quickly required more branches to be open to serve the new neighborhoods that branched out to the southeast and southwest. Among these branches were four Ross branches, funded with a $100,000 donation from Frederick Ross who was a Denver Real Estate Investor and the Library Commissioner. In the 1990s Denver voters approved a $91.6 million bond issue to add onto the Fisher/Hoyt building; the new 540,000-square-foot (50,000 m^{2}) structure, designed by the 2012 Driehaus Prize winner Michael Graves and the Denver firm of Klipp Colussy Jenks DuBois, opened in 1995. The seven-story exterior is finished with limestone and pre-cast concrete with copper accents throughout. Murals are painted inside by the artist Edward Ruscha and fossils are embedded in its floor within the Schlessman Hall. There is also an art gallery within the Level Five Gates Western History Ready Room.

== Collections ==
The Denver Public Library has a large Western History collection, which began under the direction of City Librarian Malcom G. Wyer and includes 600,000 photographs, 3,700 manuscript archives, 200,000 cataloged books, pamphlets, atlases, maps, and microfilm titles as well as a collection of Western fine art and prints. The quality of its collection of oil paintings rivals that of the Denver Art Museum next door. The library's collection includes western landscape paintings by Albert Bierstadt, Frederic Remington, Charles Marion Russell, Thomas Moran and Otto Kuhler, as well as a portrait of Colorado historian and Denver Post writer Caroline Bancroft. The photography collection includes a permanent archive of archaeologist Thomas L. Carr's work.

The Special Collections and Archives holds the Otto Perry collection of railroad photographs, numbering 20,000 negatives from all parts of North America made available for viewing on the Internet.

The Western History and Genealogy departments merged in 1995 and are located on the fifth floor. The Genealogy department includes 60,000 books, 75,000 pieces of microform, and hundreds of magazine and newsletter titles, charts, clippings, atlases and manuscripts. From 1995 until 2015, The Western History Department worked on digitizing over 100,000 of its images to make them available online.

The Blair-Caldwell African American Research Library serves as an educational and cultural resource focusing on the history, literature, art, music, religion, and politics of African Americans in Colorado and throughout the Rocky Mountain West. The Library opened in 2003 and houses a full service branch library, research archives and the Western Legacies Museum, an exhibition space that spans more than 7,000 square feet (650 m^{2}) and includes an African American Leadership Gallery, a replica of the Office of Denver Mayor Wellington E. Webb, and rotating exhibits which highlight historical periods, notable individuals and local Denver history.

== Current Services ==
=== Computers and Technology ===
All locations offer patrons access to public computers with Internet service, Microsoft Office, copying, printing, and scanning. Wireless Internet (WiFi) is also available to all visitors.

=== Library of Things ===
The Denver Public Library offers library card holders access to equipment and experiences to check out. Current items include bicycle repair kits, State Park Pass, Chromebooks, draft check meter, GoPro camera, museum and cultural passes, power check meter, Speck indoor air quality meter, video projector, and WiFi hotspot.

=== Makerspaces ===
The Denver Public Library system provides access to makerspaces, called ideaLABs, at various locations.

=== Museum Passes, Cultural Tours and Ticket Vouchers ===
Denver Public Library offers library card holders free passes to participating local museums and cultural institutions. Institutions include the Butterfly Pavilion, Denver Center for the Performing Arts Behind the Scenes Tours, Denver Firefighters Museum, Denver Museum of Nature and Science, Denver Trolley, Denver Zoo, History Colorado Center, Molly Brown House Museum, and Museum of Contemporary Art Denver. Card holders can also enter drawings to win vouchers to plays and concerts held at the Denver Center for the Performing Arts Theatre Company and Colorado Symphony.

== Branch libraries ==
- Central Library
  - Children's Library
  - Western History & Genealogy Library
- Athmar Park Branch Library
- Bear Valley Branch Library
- Blair-Caldwell African American Research Library
- Bob Ragland Branch Library, named after Bob Ragland
- Ross-Broadway Branch Library
- Ross-Cherry Creek Branch Library
- Decker Branch Library
- Eugene Field Branch Library
- Ford-Warren Branch Library
- Green Valley Ranch Branch Library
- Hadley Branch Library
- Hampden Branch Library
- John "Thunderbird Man" Emhoolah Jr. Branch Library, named after John Emhoolah Jr.
- Lena Archuleta Branch Library
- Montbello Branch Library
- Park Hill Branch Library
- Pauline Robinson Branch Library
- Ross-Phyllis Bigpond Branch Library
- Rodolfo "Corky" Gonzales Branch Library
- Sam Gary Branch Library
- Schlessman Family Branch Library
- Smiley Branch Library
- Ross-University Hills Branch Library
- Valdez-Perry Branch Library
- Virginia Village Branch Library
- Westwood Branch Library
- Woodbury Branch Library

Former branch libraries include the Dickinson Branch Library, a Carnegie library listed on the National Register of Historic Places.
