= Voorhies Memorial =

Monument in Denver, Colorado, U.S.

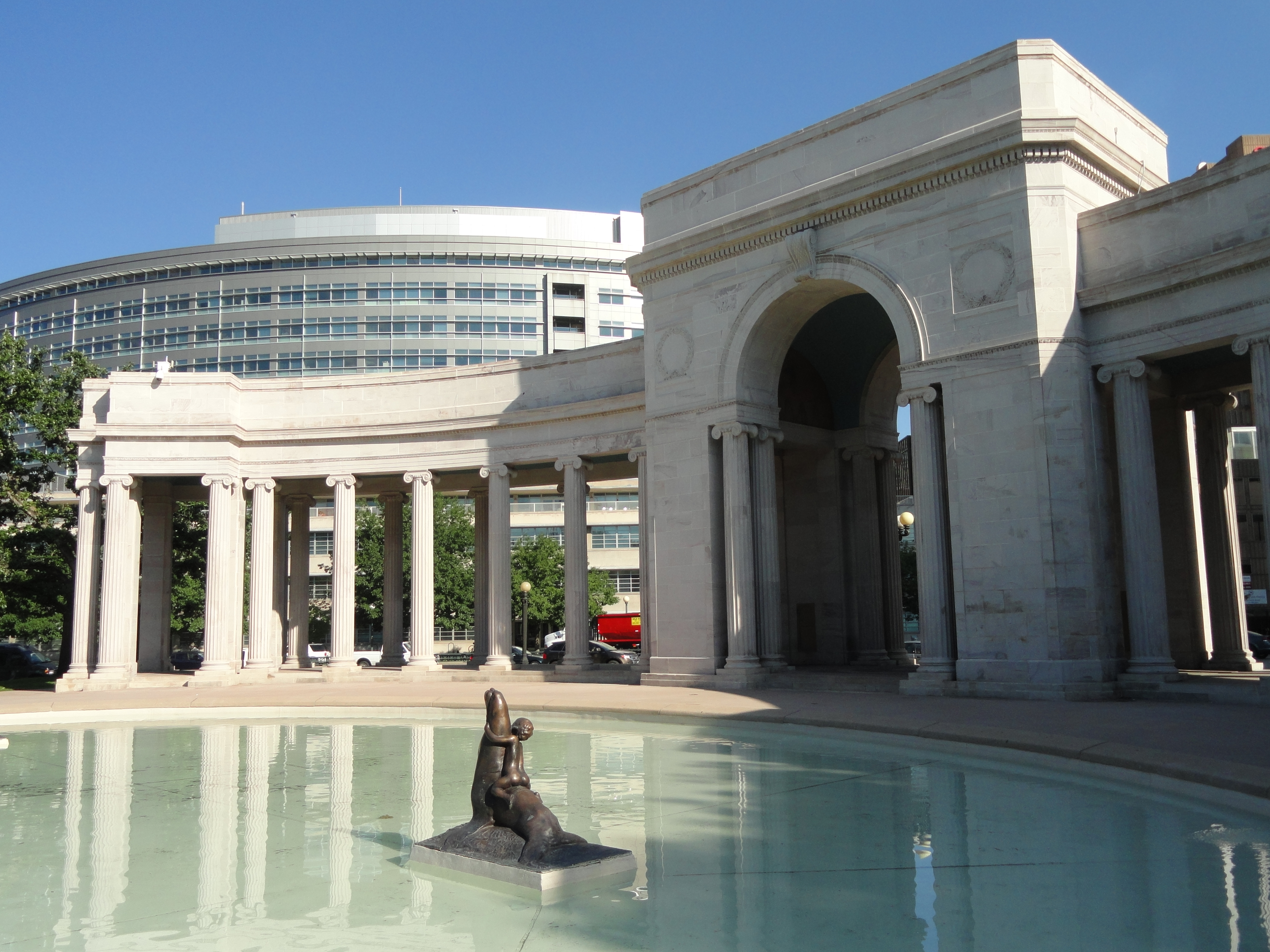
- The memorial in 2011
- Interactive map of Voorhies Memorial
- Location: Denver, Colorado, U.S.
- Coordinates: 39°44′25″N 104°59′20″W

The Voorhies Memorial is located in the Denver Civic Center, in the U.S. state of Colorado. It was designed by Fisher & Fisher and completed in 1919. It has a triumphal arch and curved supporting wings with roofed columns, as well as murals by Allen Tupper True. It also has a pond with a sculpture of a sea lion (sometimes described as a seal) by Robert Garrison, prompting some to refer to the memorial as the "Seal Pond". The fountain is also called Sea Lion Fountain or Sea Lions Fountain.

== History ==
The site housed the temporary art display and candlelight vigil in honor of the 2020 World Day of Remembrance.
