= Kirkland Museum of Fine & Decorative Art =

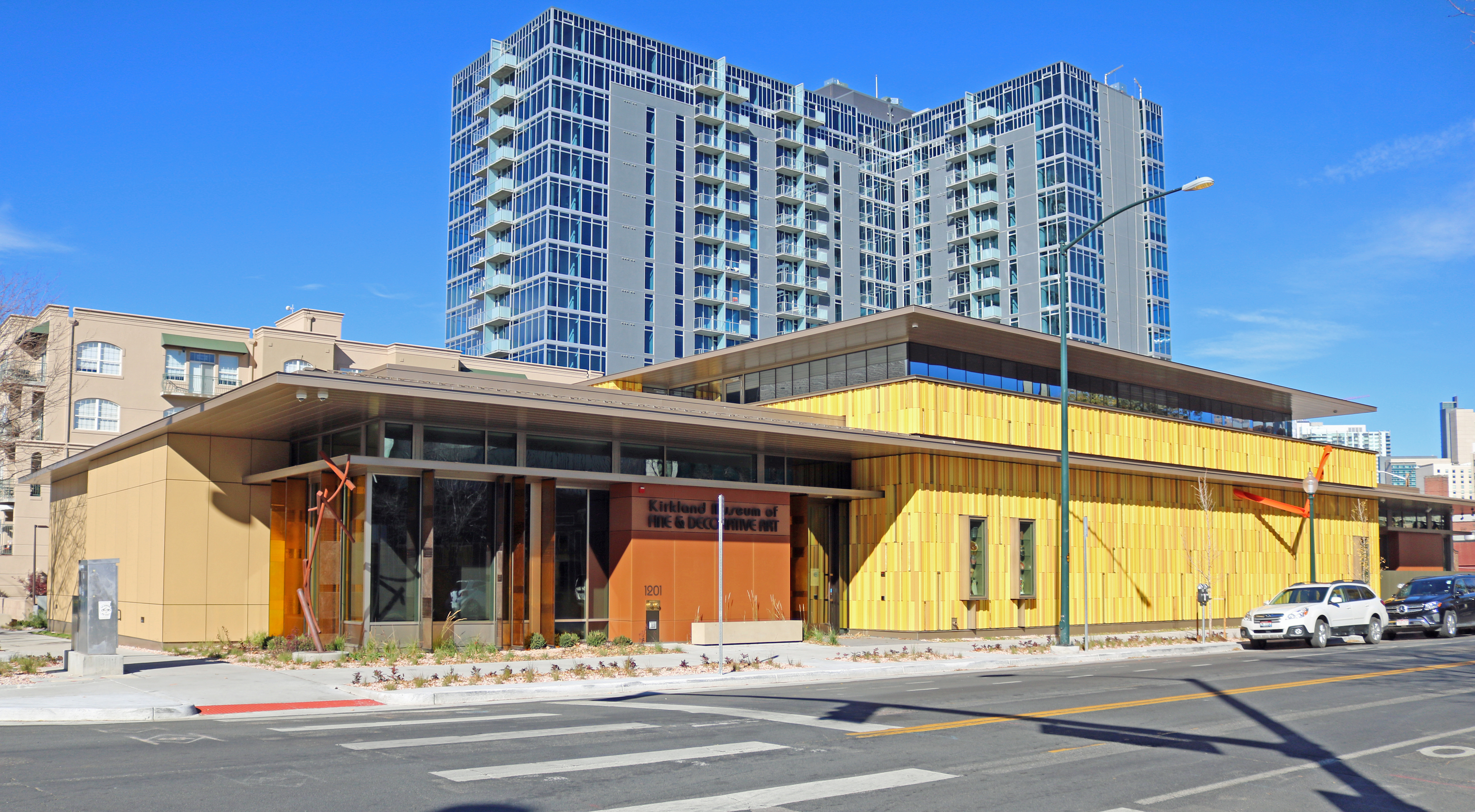
- The museum's new building on Bannock Street
- Established: 2 April 2003
- Location: 12th Avenue and Bannock Street; Denver, Colorado
- Coordinates: 39.735°N 104.99°W
- Type: Art museum
- Website: www.kirklandmuseum.org

Kirkland Museum of Fine & Decorative Art is an art museum in Denver, Colorado, United States. The museum houses three principal collections and includes the original studio and art school building of artist Vance Kirkland (1904–1981). On 10 March 2018, Kirkland Museum reopened after moving to a new building at 1201 Bannock Street in Denver's Golden Triangle Creative District.

== History ==
Vance Kirkland's studio and art school building (1910–1911), which is preserved as part of the larger Kirkland Museum, is the oldest commercial art building in Denver and the second oldest in Colorado (after the Van Briggle Memorial Pottery in Colorado Springs of 1908). The original building was designed in a distinctive Arts & Crafts style by architects Maurice Biscoe (1871–1953) and Henry Hewitt (1875–1926). commissioned by Henry Read (1851–1935), one of 13 founders of the Denver Artists' Club, which later became the Denver Art Association (1917) and then the Denver Art Museum (1923). This building, originally located at 1311 Pearl Street, served as Read's Students' School of Art. Kirkland recounted that Read and other members used their homes and the Pearl Street building for meetings of the Denver Artists' Club from 1911 until 1922 when this organization was deeded Chappell House (1300 Logan, razed 1970).

In January 1929, Kirkland became the Founding Director of the School of Art at the University of Denver. In 1932 he resigned from the University of Denver when they would not grant credit for art courses toward graduation, and leased Read's Pearl Street property. He ran the Kirkland School of Art until 1946, with classes accredited by the University of Colorado (1933–1946), when he returned as Director of the Art School at the University of Denver, retiring in 1969. Kirkland had, by that time, purchased the 1311 Pearl Street building and used it as his personal painting studio until his death in 1981.

After his death, Kirkland willed his estate to longtime family friend Hugh A. Grant. In 1998, under the direction of Grant, construction began on an adjoining facility, adding 8,830 square feet to the original studio. Completed in 2000, the addition allowed for expanded exhibition space and visitor amenities, while maintaining the integrity of the original studio. Kirkland Museum opened to the public in April 2003 under Grant, the founding director and curator. On May 2, 2016, the museum temporarily closed to visitors to prepare to relocate to 12th Avenue and Bannock Street.

Vance Kirkland's studio and art school building is the heart of the Kirkland Museum experience. On Sunday, November 6, 2016, in partnership with Mammoth Moving & Rigging Inc. and Shaw Construction, the three-room Kirkland studio building was moved through the neighborhood via eight sets of remote-controlled articulating wheels to its new home eight blocks west at 12th and Bannock, where it is part of the new Kirkland Museum. Because of Vance Kirkland's studio & art school building, Kirkland Museum is listed as a member of Historic Artists' Homes and Studios, a program of the National Trust for Historic Preservation, along with the homes and studios of Jackson Pollock/Lee Krasner, Charles Russell, Georgia O'Keeffe, Thomas Hart Benton, Charles Burchfield, N. C. Wyeth, Grant Wood and others.

A new 38,500-square-foot building, designed by Jim Olson of Seattle-based Olson Kundig and funded by Merle Chambers Fund was built to house Kirkland Museum at 1201 Bannock Street in Denver's Golden Triangle Creative District. The new museum opened to the public on March 10, 2018.

== Collections ==
The museum houses three primary collections: an international decorative arts collection, a regional collection with a focus on Colorado art, and a retrospective of the work of Kirkland. At the museum's original location at 1311 Pearl Street 3,500 decorative art pieces and 400 paintings and sculptures were on view. The new building at 12th Avenue and Bannock provides for about 65% more display space and the salon style of display is replicated in the new museum.

(1) International Decorative Arts Collection: Includes notable examples from the decorative art movements of Arts & Crafts, Aesthetic, Art Nouveau, Glasgow Style, Wiener Werkstätte, De Stijl, Bauhaus, Art Deco, Modern, Pop Art, and Postmodern. The collection focuses on objects from c. 1875 to 1990. According to scholars, including Patricia Kane, Curator of American Decorative Arts at Yale University, "Nowhere else in the country can one see such a comprehensive presentation of international 20th century design." Peter Loughrey, Director Los Angeles Modern Auction, similarly stated, "I believe your museum has the finest survey of 20th century design on view in America today."

(2) Colorado/Regional Collection: This collection includes over 7,000 works by more than 700 Colorado artists, including almost 300 women artists. Kirkland Museum preserves the history of Colorado art from traditional through modern, from 1820 to about 1990, with an emphasis on the 1850s onward. Two Denver art critics have said: "...the Kirkland became the state's most important repository of Colorado art." "...the Kirkland has quickly become the largest repository of such Colorado work anywhere."

(3) Kirkland Retrospective: Kirkland (1904–1981) painted over 1,200 paintings, with works spanning 55 years, ranging from Realism to Surrealism to Abstract Expressionism to his later abstraction. A rotating selection of all five of Kirkland's painting periods is shown, including his idiosyncratic late dot paintings. Kirkland's paintings have been widely exhibited at 70 museums and 30 universities in 13 countries and 32 states. A one-hour television documentary, Vance Kirkland's Visual Language—with seven curators and directors from five American museums—was aired on PBS stations from 1994 to 1996.

== Displays ==
The three collections make the Kirkland Museum different from other museums. The unusual way they are displayed gives the visitor an alternative museum experience.

(a) Most large city museums are displayed more sparsely than the Kirkland Museum, and decorative art and fine art are usually shown in separate rooms. Kirkland Museum is arranged "salon style" much like a home where—similar to the Barnes Foundation (Philadelphia), the Isabella Stewart Gardner Museum (Boston), the Neue Galerie (NYC), and a few others—fine and decorative art are exhibited together.

(b) In addition to paintings and sculpture being displayed together with furniture, groupings or vignettes are often arranged to showcase a particular design period such as Art Deco. Furniture is frequently accessorized with period radios, phones, lamps and other items. Most furniture is placed on the floor at the Kirkland Museum.

(c) Another exhibition characteristic of the Kirkland Museum is "comparative display" where more than one design style is shown, for example in the museum's Promenade Gallery. This allows college students to compare Arts & Crafts, Art Nouveau, Glasgow Style and Wiener Werkstätte, for instance.

== See also ==
- List of single-artist museums
