= Denver Civic Center =

Neighborhood in Denver, Colorado, USA

- U.S. National Register of Historic Places
- U.S. National Historic Landmark
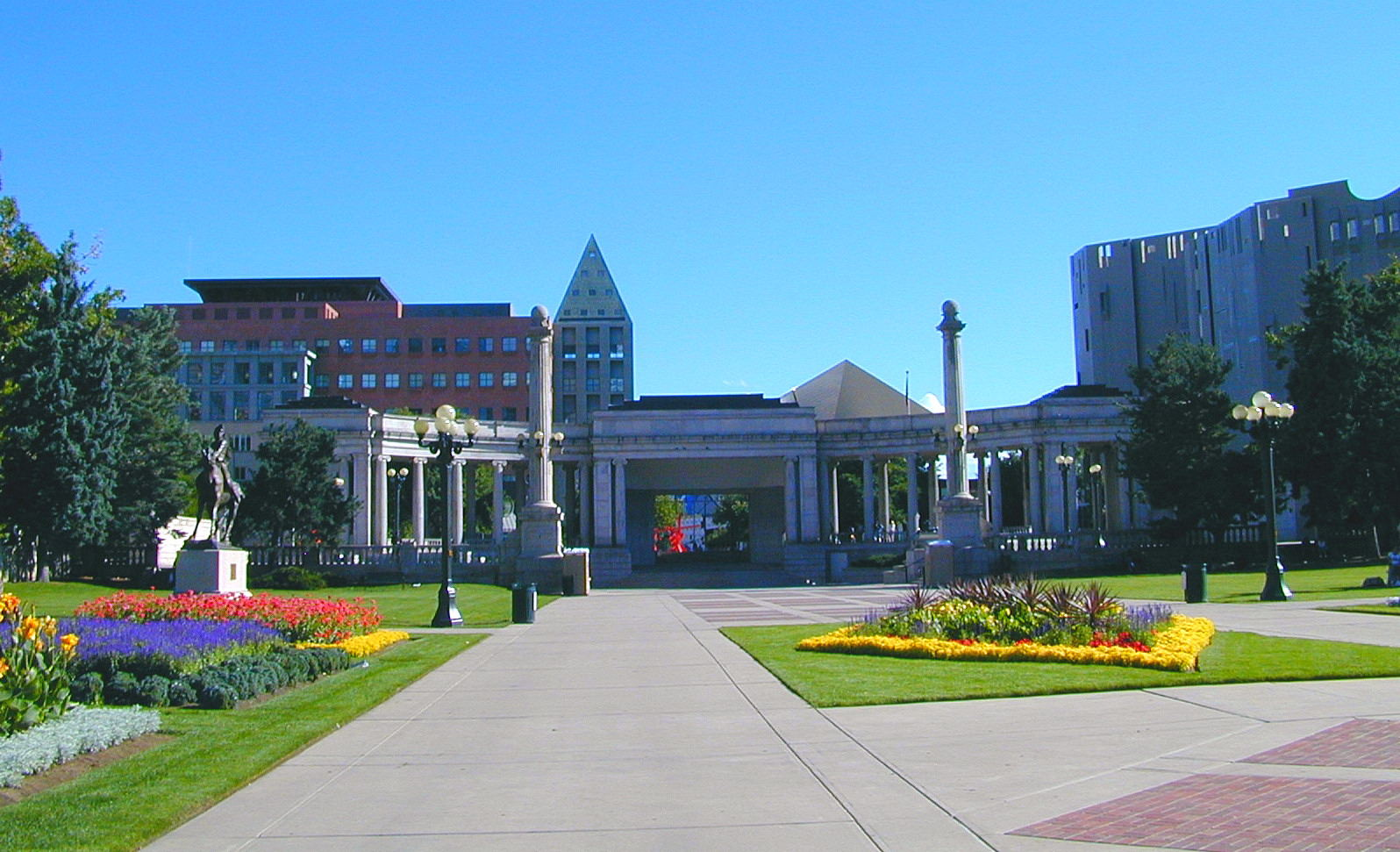
- Civic Center view of the Greek amphitheater

- Location within Colorado Location within the United States
- Interactive map showing the location of Denver Civic Center
- Location: Denver, Colorado
- Coordinates: 39°44′22″N 104°59′20″W
- NRHP reference No.: 12001017

Significant dates
- Added to NRHP: 1974
- Designated NHL: October 16, 2012

The Denver Civic Center is a civic center that includes two parks surrounded by government and cultural buildings and spaces in central Denver, Colorado, on the south side of Downtown Denver. Much of the area is a historic district which was listed on the National Register of Historic Places in 1974 (boundaries clarified 1988). A somewhat smaller area was designated a U.S. National Historic Landmark in 2012 as one of the nation's finest examples of the City Beautiful movement of civic design. Denver Civic Center lies partially within the north end of an official Denver neighborhood also named Civic Center. It includes the Colorado State Capitol building, in the west end of Denver's official Capitol Hill neighborhood, and it includes a few buildings in the south end of Denver's Central Business District.

The Civic Center area is known as the center of the civic life in the city, with numerous institutions of arts, government, and culture as well as festivals, parades, and protests throughout the year.

== Parks ==
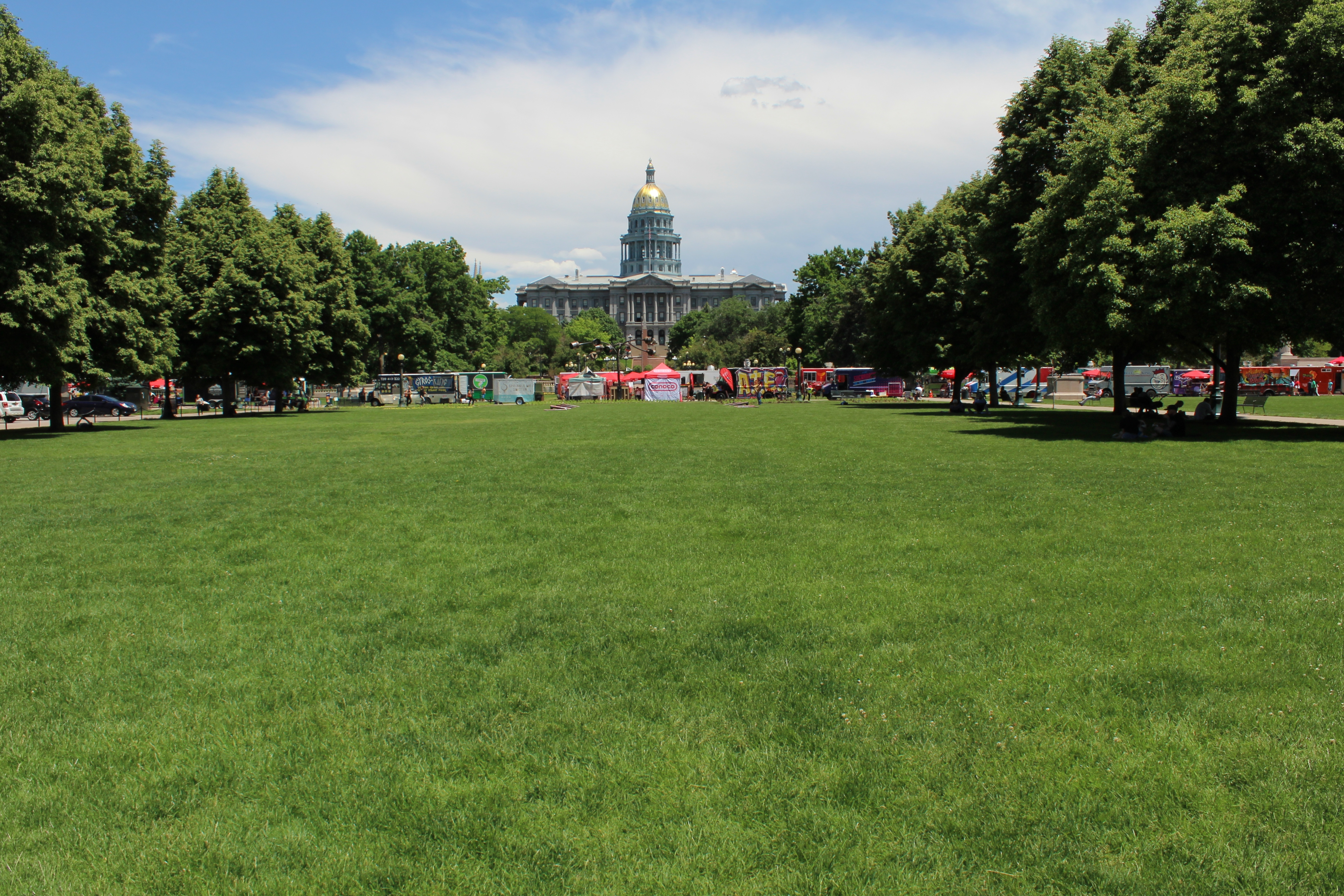
Civic Center Park, view from Bannock St.

Civic Center Park is part of the City and County of Denver park system. The park is bordered by Colfax Avenue on the north and Broadway on the east (perhaps the two best-known and most important streets in Denver), along with Bannock Street on the west and 14th Avenue on the south. The park is home to a fountain, several statues, and formal gardens, and includes a Greek amphitheater, a war memorial, and the Voorhies Memorial Seal Pond. It has symmetrical Neoclassical design. Lincoln Park, immediately east of Civic Center Park, is operated by the State of Colorado. It holds a replica of the Liberty Bell and several memorials.

== History ==
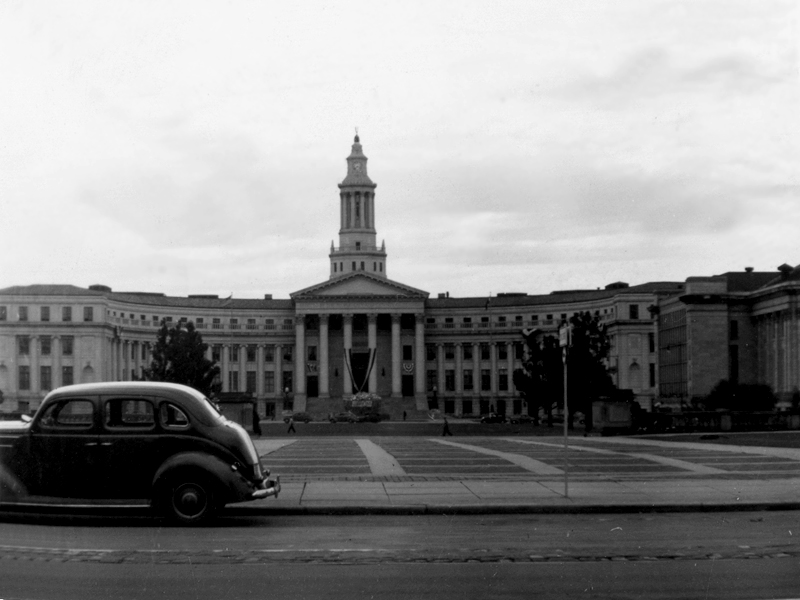
City and County Building, 1941

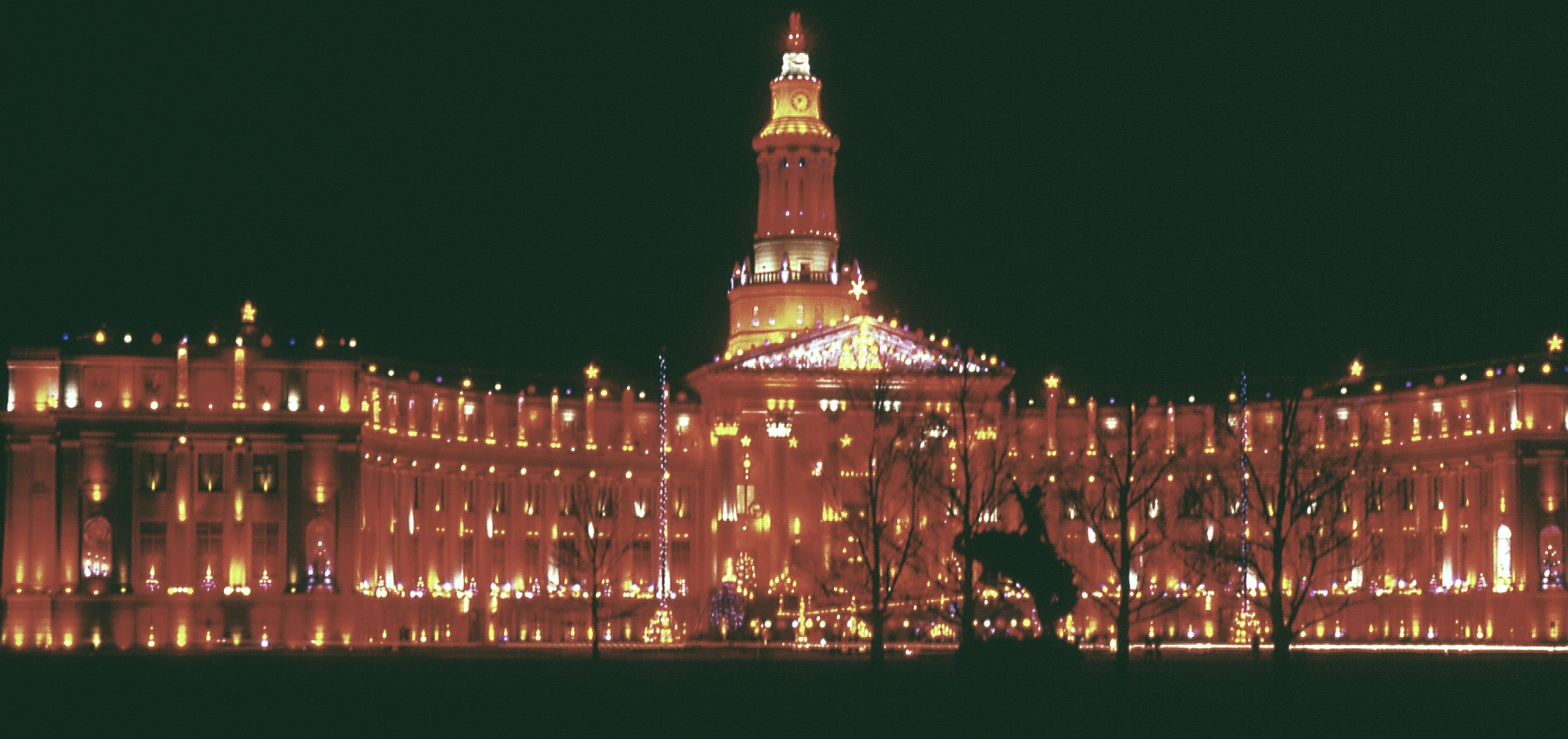
Denver City Hall lit up with Christmas lights, 1955

Civic Center was an idea that originated with former Denver mayor Robert W. Speer. In 1904, Speer proposed a series of civic improvements based on the City Beautiful Ideas shown to him at the 1893 World Columbian Exposition in Chicago.

Speer hired Charles Mulford Robinson among others to develop plans for the area. Robinson proposed extending 16th Street to the Colorado State Capitol and to group other municipal buildings around a central park area. Such a plan was expensive however. Voter approval was necessary to acquire the funds, but the measure was defeated in a 1906 election.

Undaunted, Speer gathered business leaders who brought in new ideas for the Civic Center including the creation of an east-west axial between the Colorado State Capitol, and swinging the north and south borders of the park into the city grid system.

These plans were stalled when in 1912, Speer was replaced as mayor. The new mayor brought in Frederick Law Olmsted Jr. who was developing plans for Denver's mountain parks. His ideas included an informal grove of trees on the eastern edge of the park, and a lighted concert area.

When Speer was reelected in 1916, he went against Olmsted's designs. Speer instead hired Chicago planner and architect Edward H. Bennett, a protégé of Daniel Burnham. Bennett combined the ideas of all of the previous plans, adding the Greek amphitheater, the Colonnade, the seal pond, and the realignment of Colfax Avenue and 14th Ave., around the park. The park officially opened in 1919. The City and County Building was finished in 1932.

== Institutions and development ==
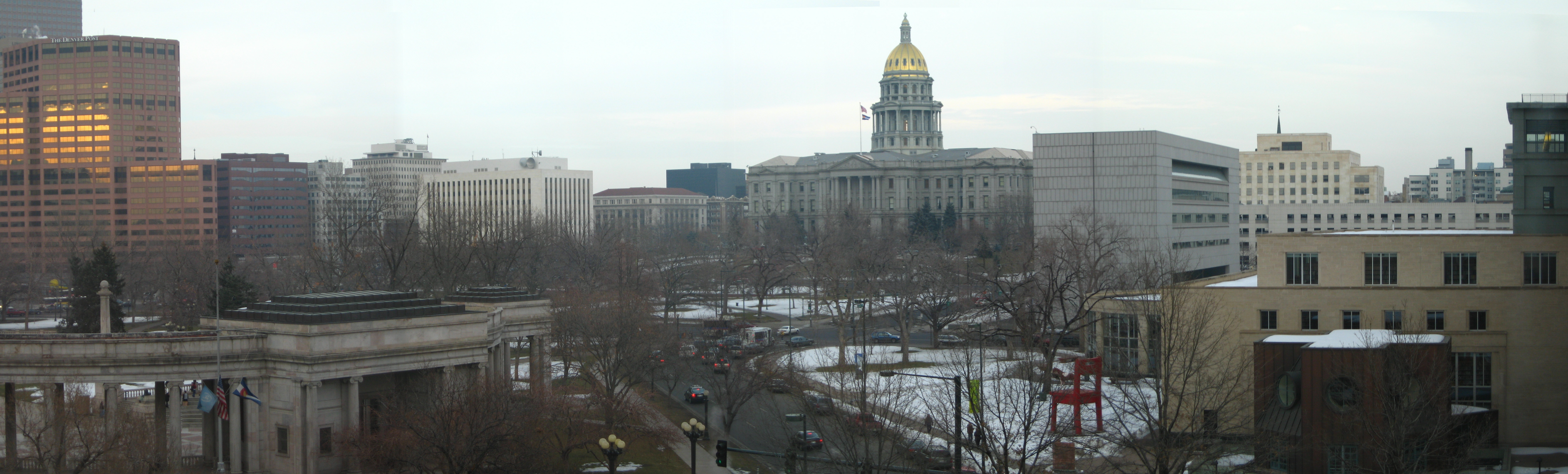
Civic Center and Colorado State Capitol from the Denver Art Museum

Civic Center has long been the government, arts, history, and learning nexus of both the state of Colorado and the Denver Metropolitan Area. Among the institutions in the Civic Center are Denver Art Museum and the Denver Central Library along the park's south side, the Colorado State Capitol and the City and County Building of Denver along the east and west axis of the park, the Wellington E. Webb Municipal Office Building on the park's north side, and the History Colorado Center and the Ralph Carr Colorado Judicial Center to the southeast of the park. The Denver Mint lies immediately west of the Civic Center Park across the street from the City and County Building.

The area has seen expanded civic uses in recent decades. Voters in 2004 approved a new Denver Justice Center, two blocks west of Civic Center Park. This project was completed in 2010. The McNichols Civic Center Building, within the park at its northwest corner, was Denver's first public library and in 2012 was renovated to serve the Denver Arts and Venues agency. Plans have been floated to use the building as a museum of Denver history. In 2024 Denver purchased the former headquarters of the Denver Post, north of the park, to serve the courts and legal services.

== Events ==
Civic Center is known throughout the state as the rendezvous for the largest and most important cultural and civic events. Being at the center of the state and local government institutions, Civic Center has become the place for political statement for various groups and individuals representing a variety of causes. In 1990 and 1991, the Civic Center was the location of the CART Grand Prix of Denver.

It was Civic Center where the public held a vigil for the victims of Columbine High School massacre, and 9/11. Former presidential candidate and Denver native John Kerry made a 2004 campaign stop at Civic Center, and 2008 Democratic nominee Barack Obama gave a speech there on October 26, 2008 to an estimated 100,000 supporters.

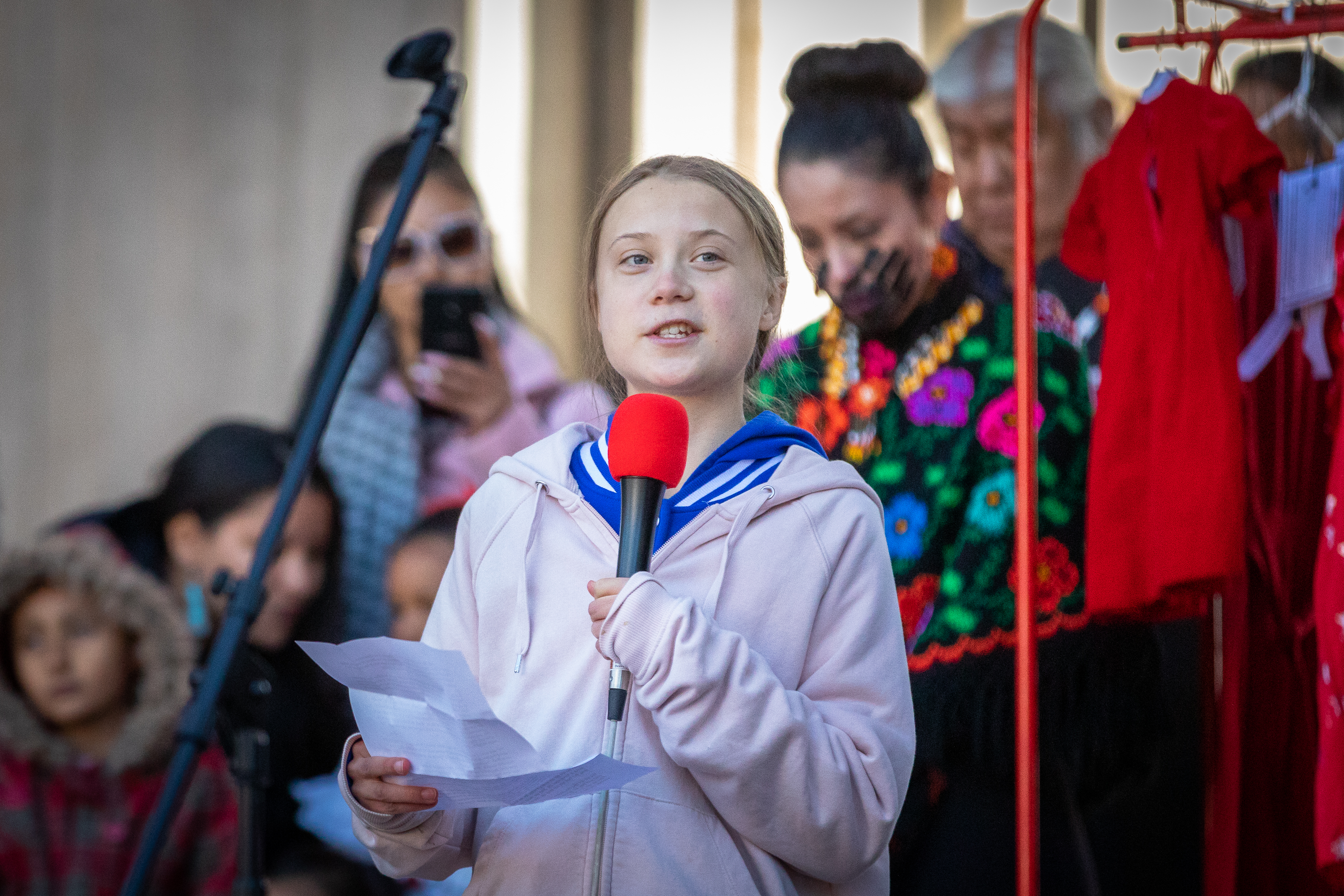
Greta Thunberg delivering a speech from the Denver Civic Center in October 2019

On October 11, 2019, a School strike for climate protest was held in Civic Center Park with Greta Thunberg.

Civic Center is also the location for many annual events. These include:

- January - The City and County Building has a Christmas lights display up until the National Western Stock Show ends in mid January.
- March – Civic Center is at the end of one of the longest St. Patrick's Day parades in the nation.
- April - Flyhi 420 Festival an annual pro-cannabis rally/ cannabis culture gathering is held in Civic Center every year on April 20, otherwise known as 420.
- May - Denver has a large Cinco de Mayo festival, held at Civic Center.
- June - Civic Center is host to the People's Fair, a bohemian festival with various music, art, political booths, and other happenings; PrideFest, the annual gay pride festival is held at Civic Center, which is also the endpoint of the parade.
- Summer - There are various theatre and music events held throughout the summer at the Greek amphitheater.
- Summer - Each Wednesday night, the Denver Cruiser Ride stops at the Greek amphitheater, which riders refer to as the "Circle of Death."
- September - A Taste of Colorado is a food and music festival held during Labor Day weekend at the park.
- October - The park is the end point for a Columbus Day parade that often brings protests from American Indian groups.
- December - The Parade of Lights ends at the City and County Building which has holiday lights from the beginning of the parade until the National Western Stock Show.

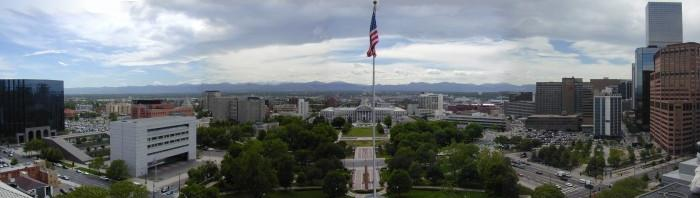
Civic Center from the Colorado State Capitol

== See also ==
- Yule marble
- National Register of Historic Places listings in downtown Denver
