= Civic Center, Denver (neighborhood) =

Human settlement in Denver, Colorado, United States of America

Coordinates: 39.7369°N 104.9902°W

Civic Center, Denver is a neighborhood in Denver, Colorado, United States. The northern part of the neighborhood overlaps partially with the Denver Civic Center, an area of parks and civic buildings.

The U.S. Census estimated the neighborhood's population in 2023 at 3,992. The neighborhood has become popularly known as the Golden Triangle, particularly since a redevelopment boom beginning in the 1990s.

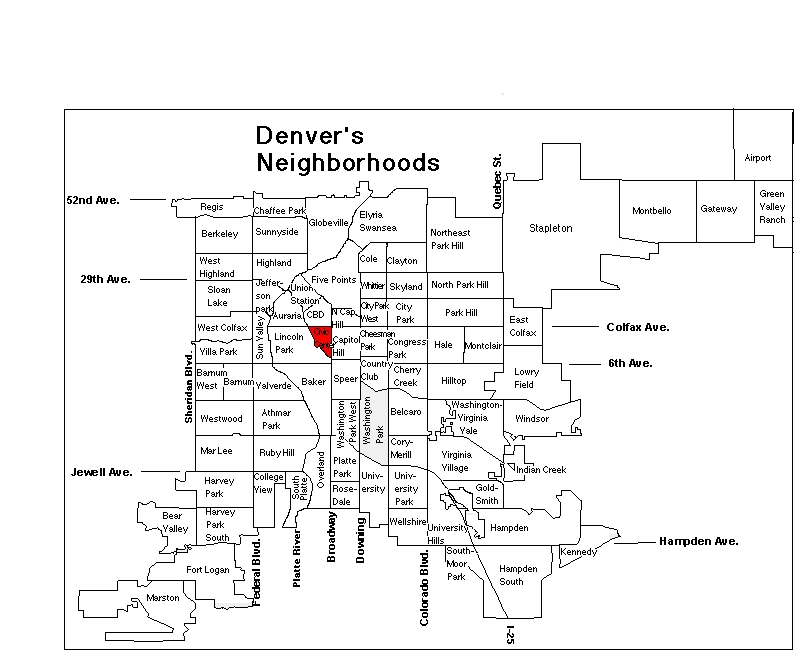
Map of Denver's neighborhoods with Civic Center highlighted.

The Civic Center neighborhood is one of the City of Denver's official neighborhoods designated for planning and city services' delivery purposes.

The boundaries of the official neighborhood are:

- North – Colfax Avenue
- West and south – Speer Boulevard
- East – Broadway

It includes the Civic Center Park and some of its surrounding government and cultural institutions that comprise the Denver Civic Center, although not the center's Lincoln Park, not the Colorado State Capitol building in the center's east end, and not the center's few buildings north of Colfax.

The Golden Triangle Creative District is an organization of residents and property owners that is an officially recognized Registered Neighborhood Organization, and was formerly known as the Golden Triangle Neighborhood Association. This organization defines its area to be slightly larger, with its eastern border at Lincoln, one block further east (and thereby including Lincoln Park). The 2022 population of the Golden Triangle was estimated at 3,586. This neighborhood association notes that it spans 45 city blocks, with 16 or more galleries and museums and dozens of restaurants and stores. The creative district became official in 2016. In 2018, it began an effort to become a business improvement district, which would be able to assess taxes and improve public infrastructure. Within the boundaries of the Golden Triangle are Civic Center Park, the City and County of Denver offices, the Colorado State Capitol, History Colorado Center, the Denver Art Museum, the Denver Mint Museum, the Clyfford Still Museum, the Kirkland Museum of Fine & Decorative Art, and the Denver Central Library.

The Downtown Denver Partnership and the Golden Triangle Neighborhood Association define the Golden Triangle as extending one block east to Lincoln Street, thereby incorporating almost all of Civic Center Park and the institutions surrounding them (with the exception of the Colorado State Capitol in the Capitol Hill neighborhood and a few buildings to the north of Colfax Avenue). The main arterial street through the Golden Triangle is Bannock Street; 13th, 14th, and 8th avenues are important east-west arterials as well. All of the streets that form the neighborhood's borders (Lincoln/Broadway, Colfax, and Speer) are important transportation corridors in Denver.

== History ==
The Civic Center or Golden Triangle is one of Denver's oldest neighborhoods, with many single-family Victorian homes and bungalows built in the late 19th and early 20th centuries. Between 1904 and 1919, Denver Mayor Robert Speer completed his ambitious plan for the downtown Civic Center area, on the north edge of the larger neighborhood, adding many civic institutions and a neoclassic park. The plan also placed a leafy concrete urban canyon around Cherry Creek, creating Speer Boulevard, the larger neighborhood's western and southern border.

Starting in the 1990s, perhaps as a result of the new Central Library, the neighborhood began its transformation into a functional multi-use neighborhood. New condominium and loft developments came into the neighborhood, and many of the old supply stores and garages were transformed into restaurants, art galleries, and small offices.

== Today ==
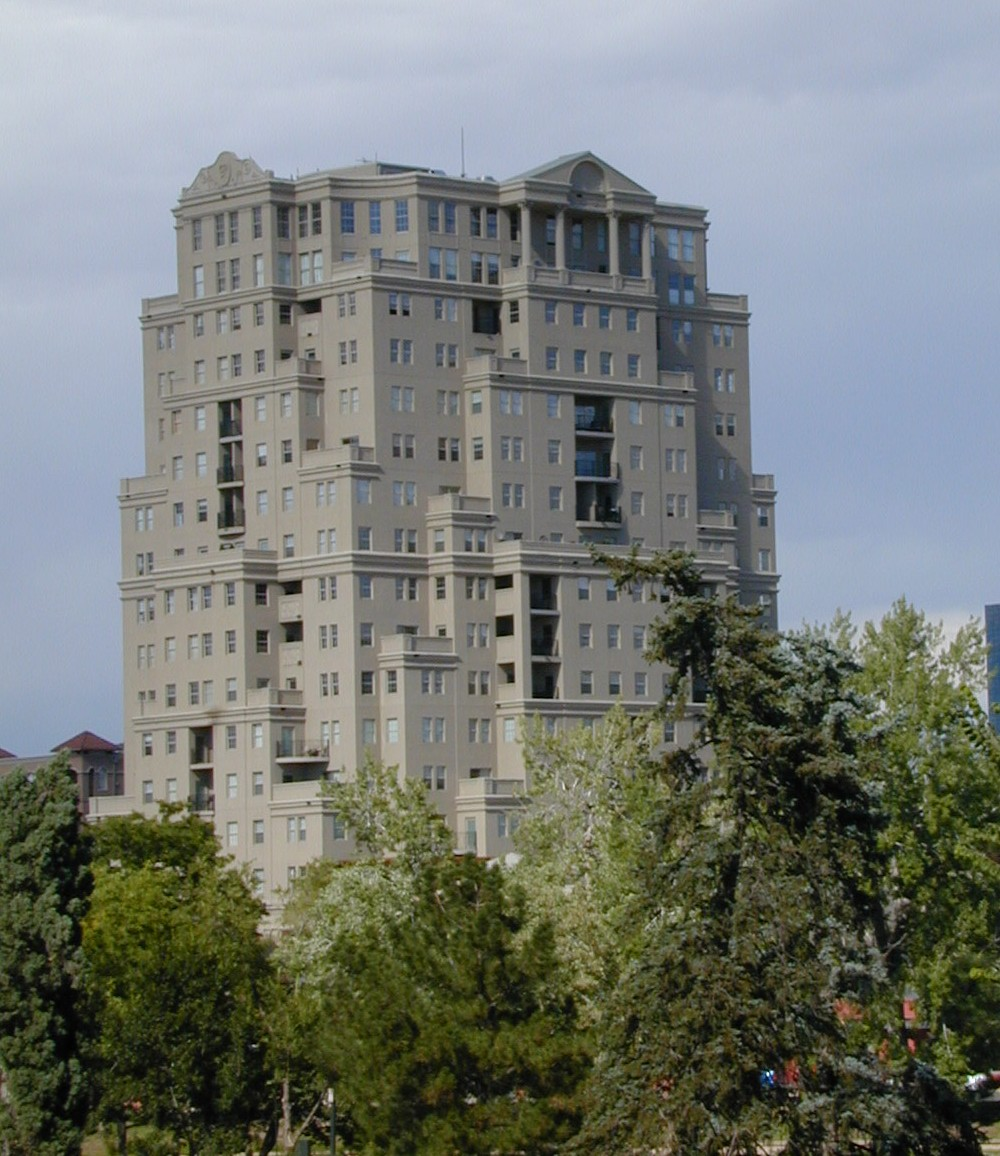
Prado Building, developed by Craig Nassi.

The Golden Triangle continues to undergo many transformations. The Denver Art Museum's new Frederic C. Hamilton Building was completed in fall 2006, further developing the neighborhood's art scene, which includes various art galleries and the Curious Theatre Company. Denver's new justice center and jail opened in late 2010. In 2011, The Clyfford Still Museum opened next to the Denver Art Museum. In 2012, the agency opened the new state history museum of Colorado, the History Colorado Center. That same year, the Colorado State Judiciary building opened. The Kirkland Museum of Fine & Decorative Art opened its new location in the Golden Triangle in 2018. The Denver Art Museum reopened the renovated Gio Ponti-designed Lanny & Sharon Martin Building (formerly the North Building) and the new Anna & John J. Sie Welcome Center in 2021.

The average sale price for a home in Golden Triangle in June of 2016 was $659,900.

== See also ==
- Bibliography of Colorado
- Geography of Colorado
- History of Colorado
- Index of Colorado-related articles
- List of Colorado-related lists
  - List of neighborhoods in Denver
  - List of populated places in Colorado
- Outline of Colorado
