= Andrews, Jaques & Rantoul =

American architectural firm

Practice information
- Partners: Robert Day Andrews; Herbert Jaques; Augustus N. Rantoul; I. Howland Jones; Maurice B. Biscoe; John T. Whitmore; Edwin B. Goodell Jr.
- Founders: Robert Day Andrews; Herbert Jaques
- Founded: 1883
- Dissolved: 1970
- Location: Boston, Massachusetts

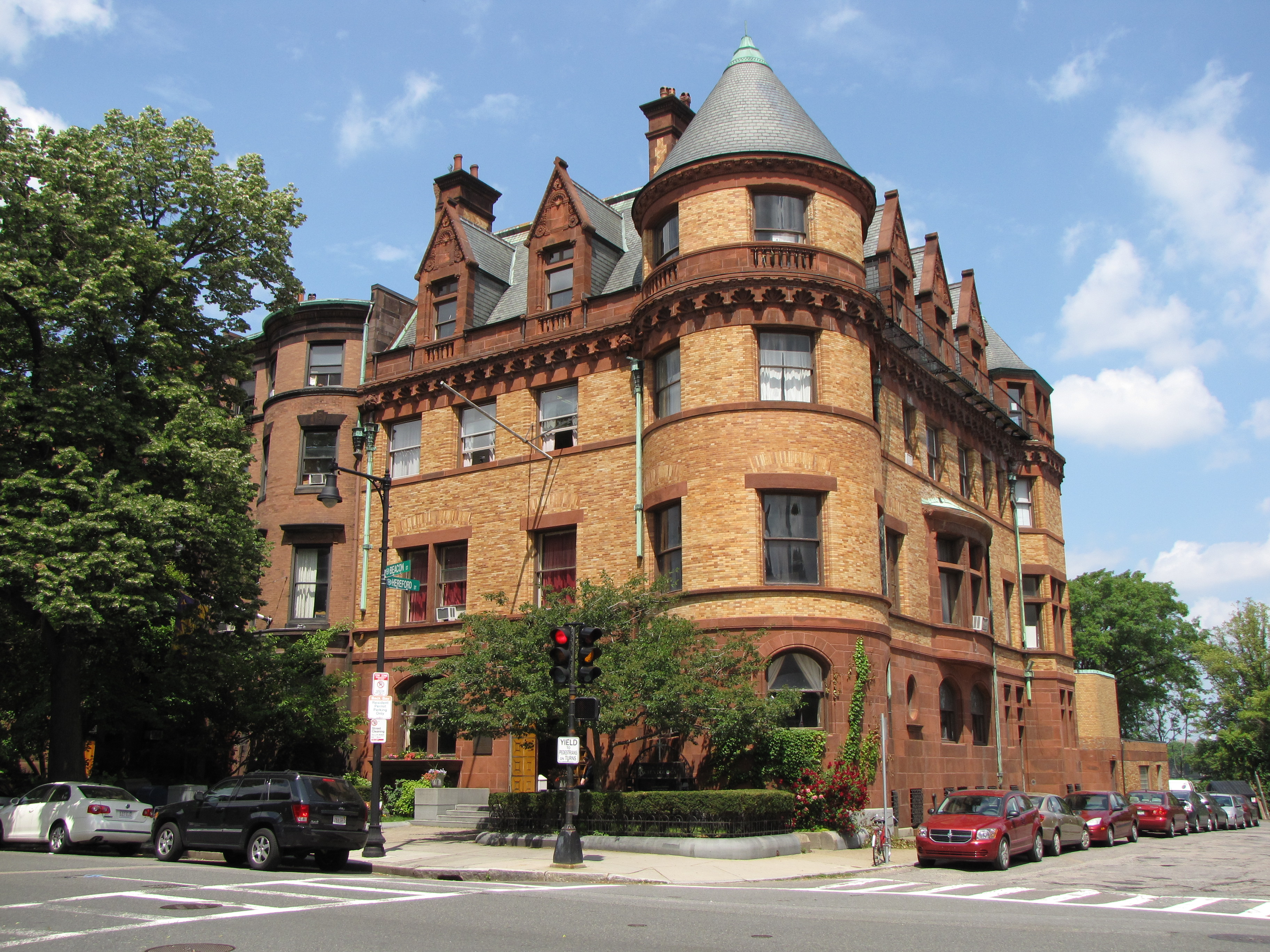
The Robert C. Hooper house in Boston, designed by Andrews & Jaques in the Châteauesque style and completed in 1889

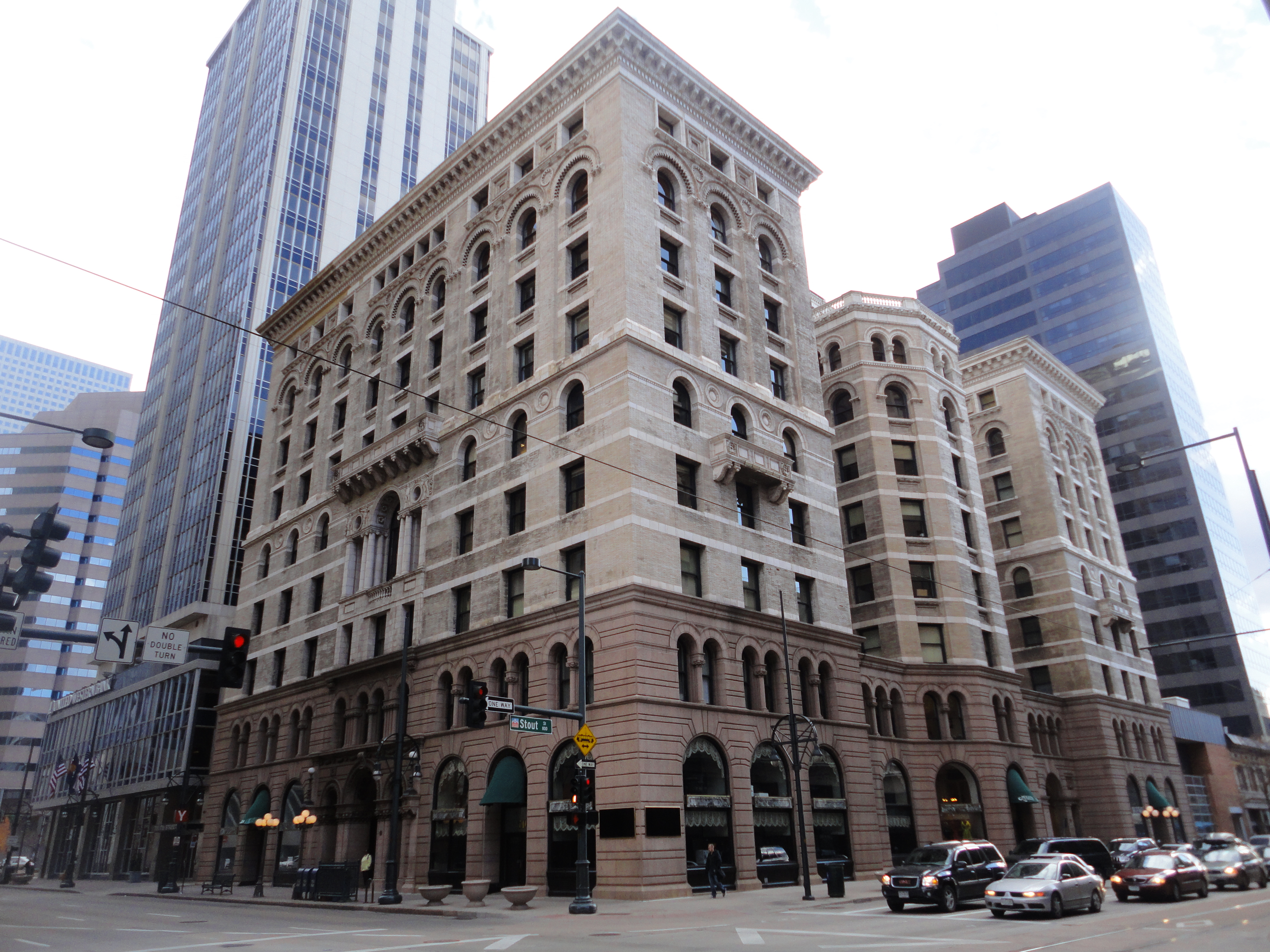
The Equitable Building in Denver, designed by Andrews, Jaques & Rantoul in the Italian Renaissance Revival style and completed in 1892

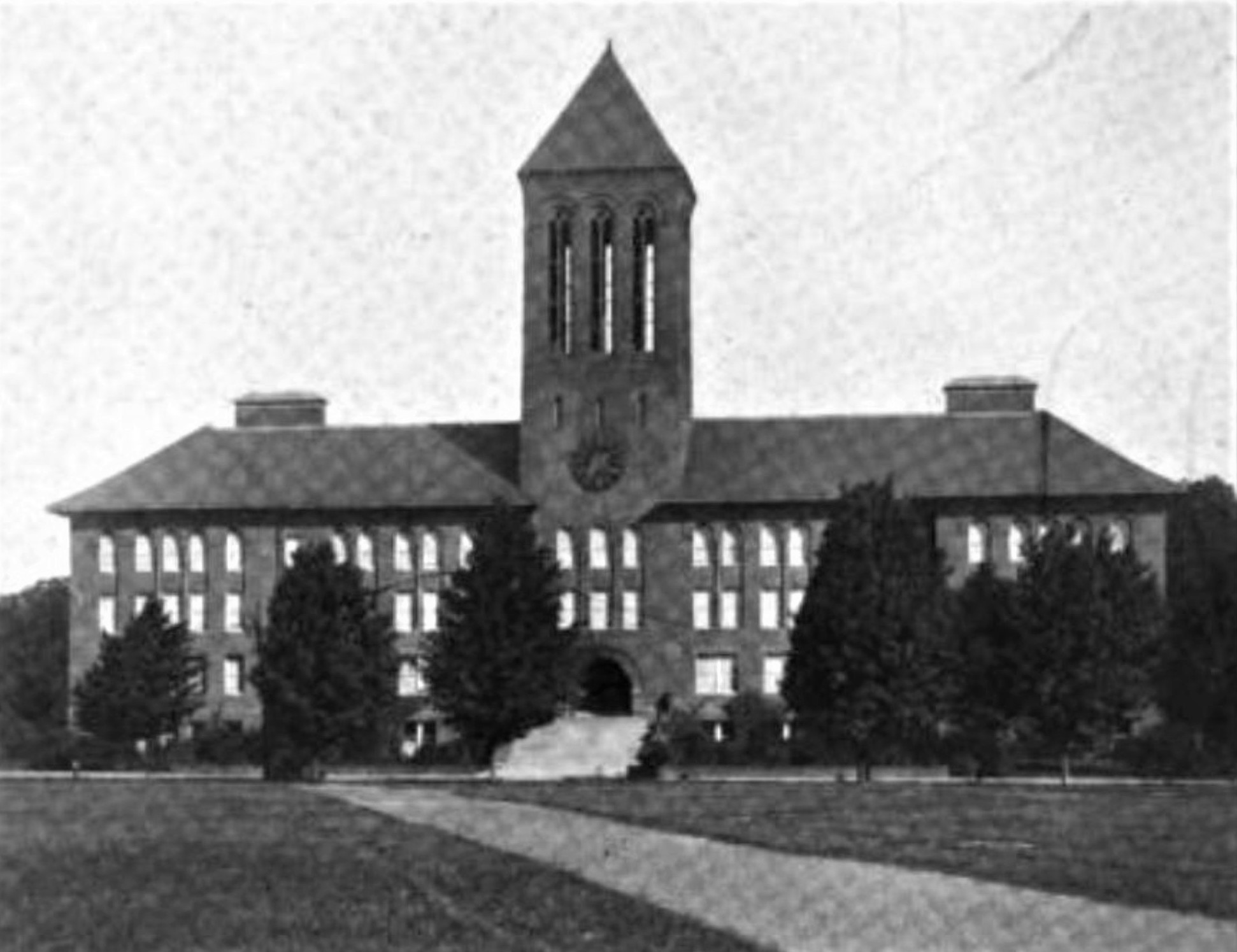
The third Brookline High School, designed by Andrews, Jaques & Rantoul in the Richardsonian Romanesque style and completed in 1895

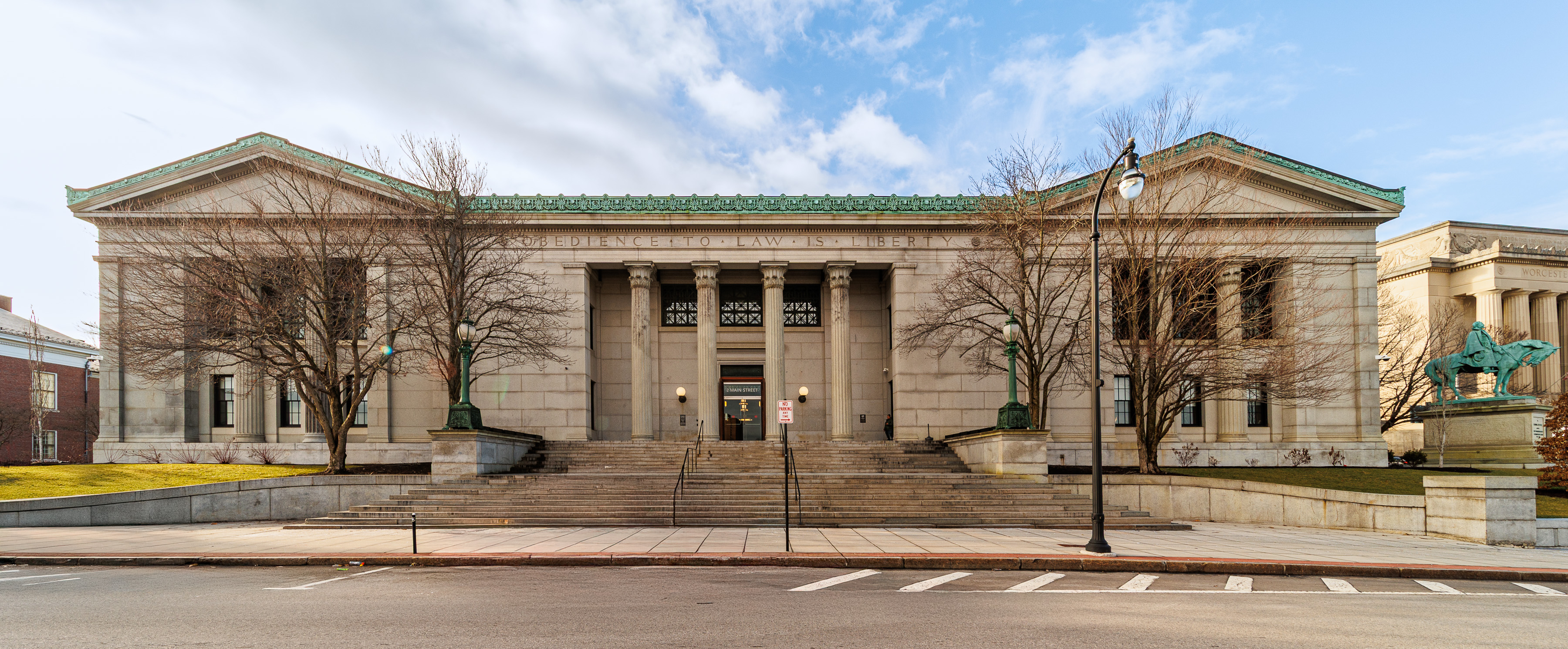
The former Worcester County Courthouse designed by Andrews, Jaques & Rantoul in the Neoclassical style and completed in 1898

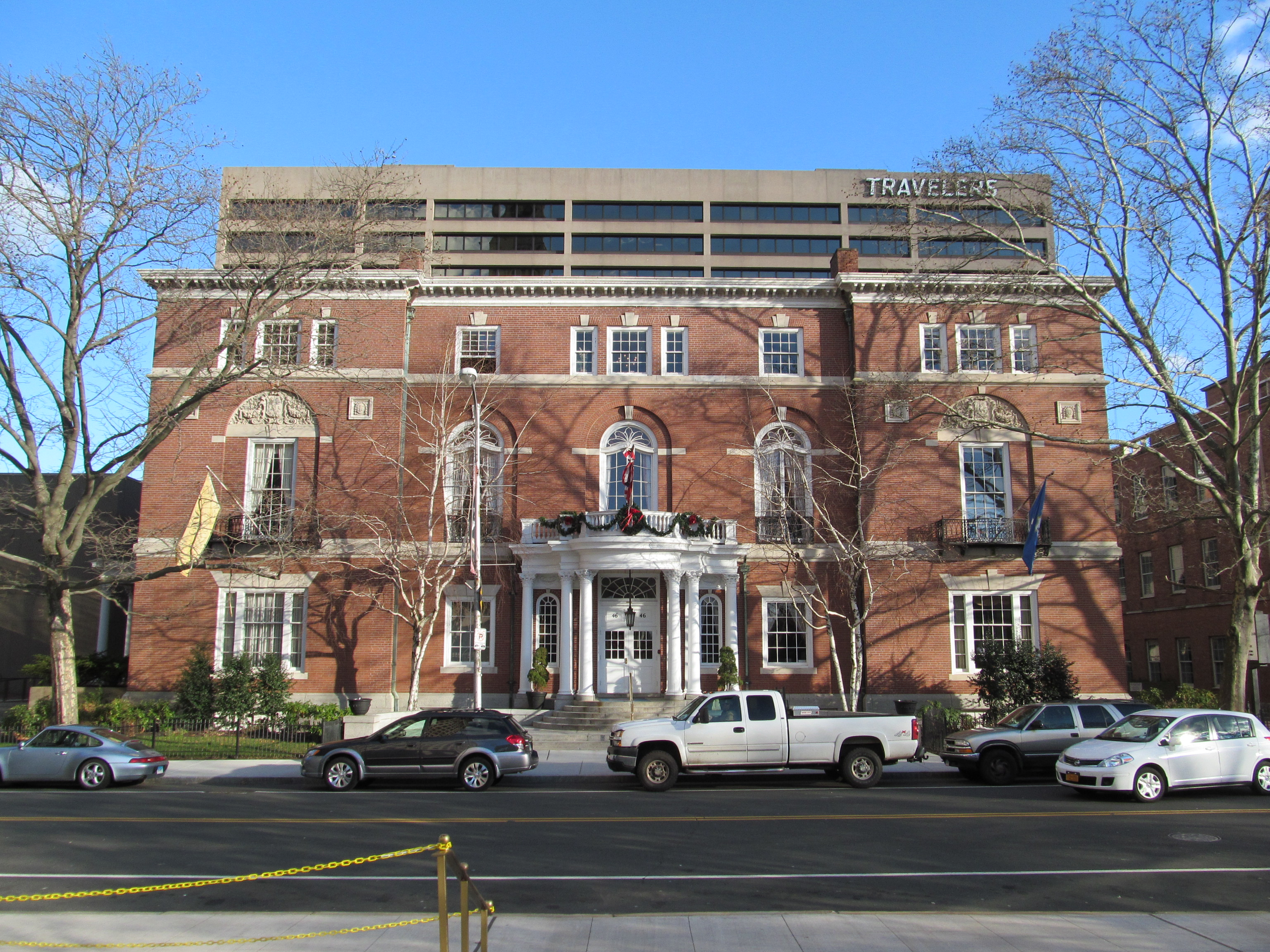
The Hartford Club, designed by Andrews, Jaques & Rantoul in the Colonial Revival style and completed in 1904

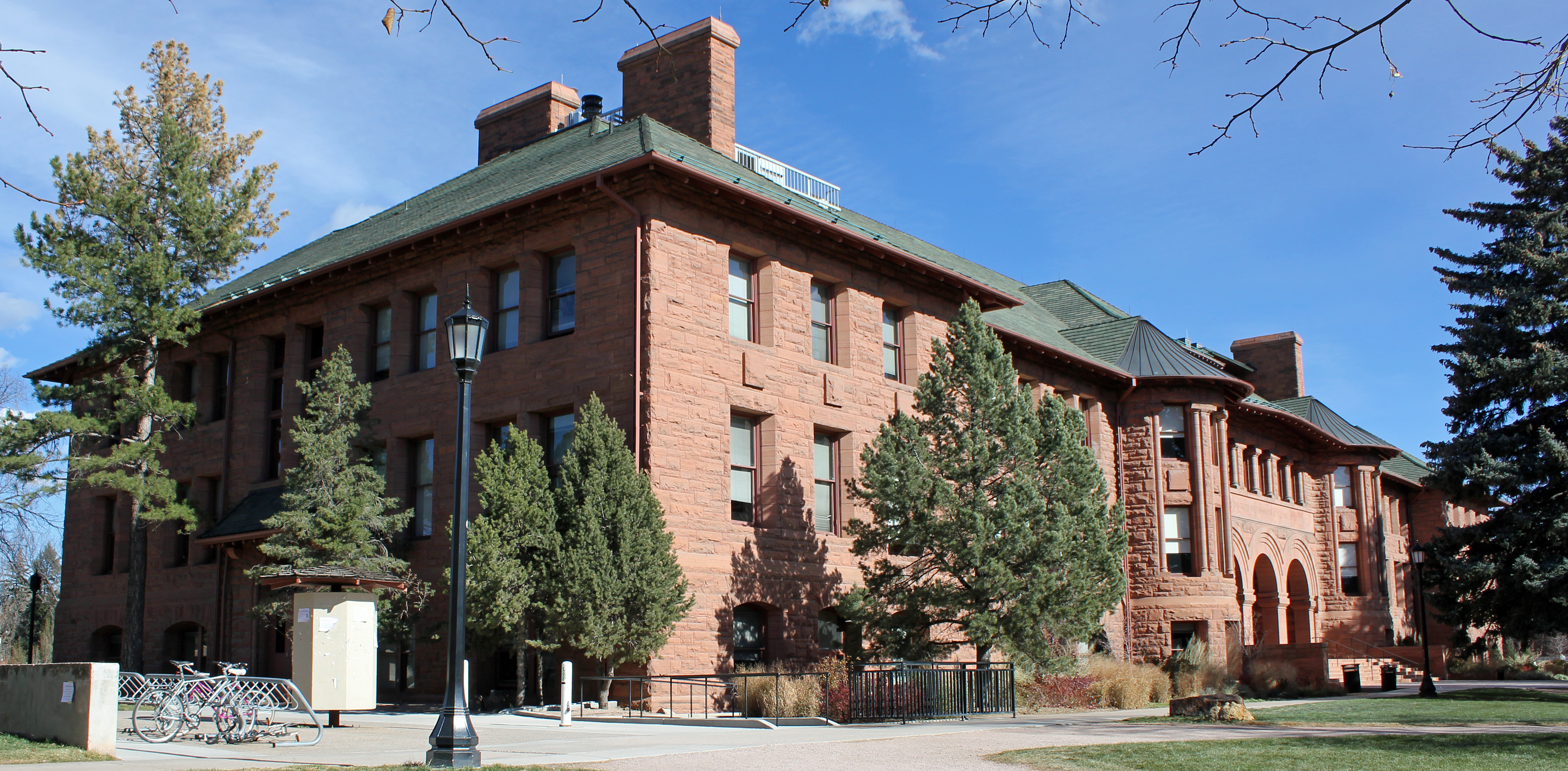
Palmer Hall of Colorado College, designed by Andrews, Jaques & Rantoul in the Richardsonian Romanesque style and completed in 1904

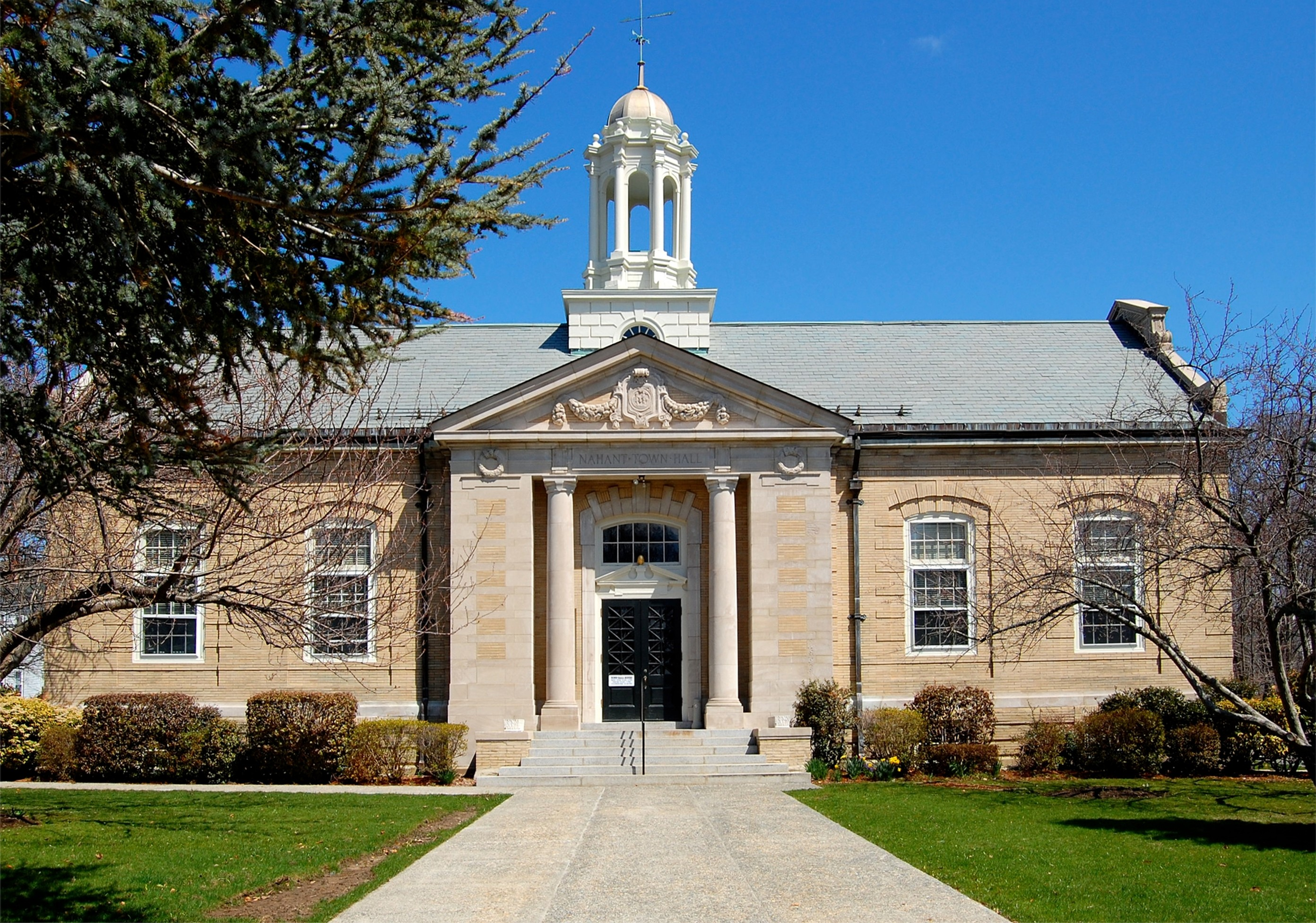
The Nahant Town Hall, designed by Andrews, Jaques & Rantoul in the Colonial Revival style and completed in 1912

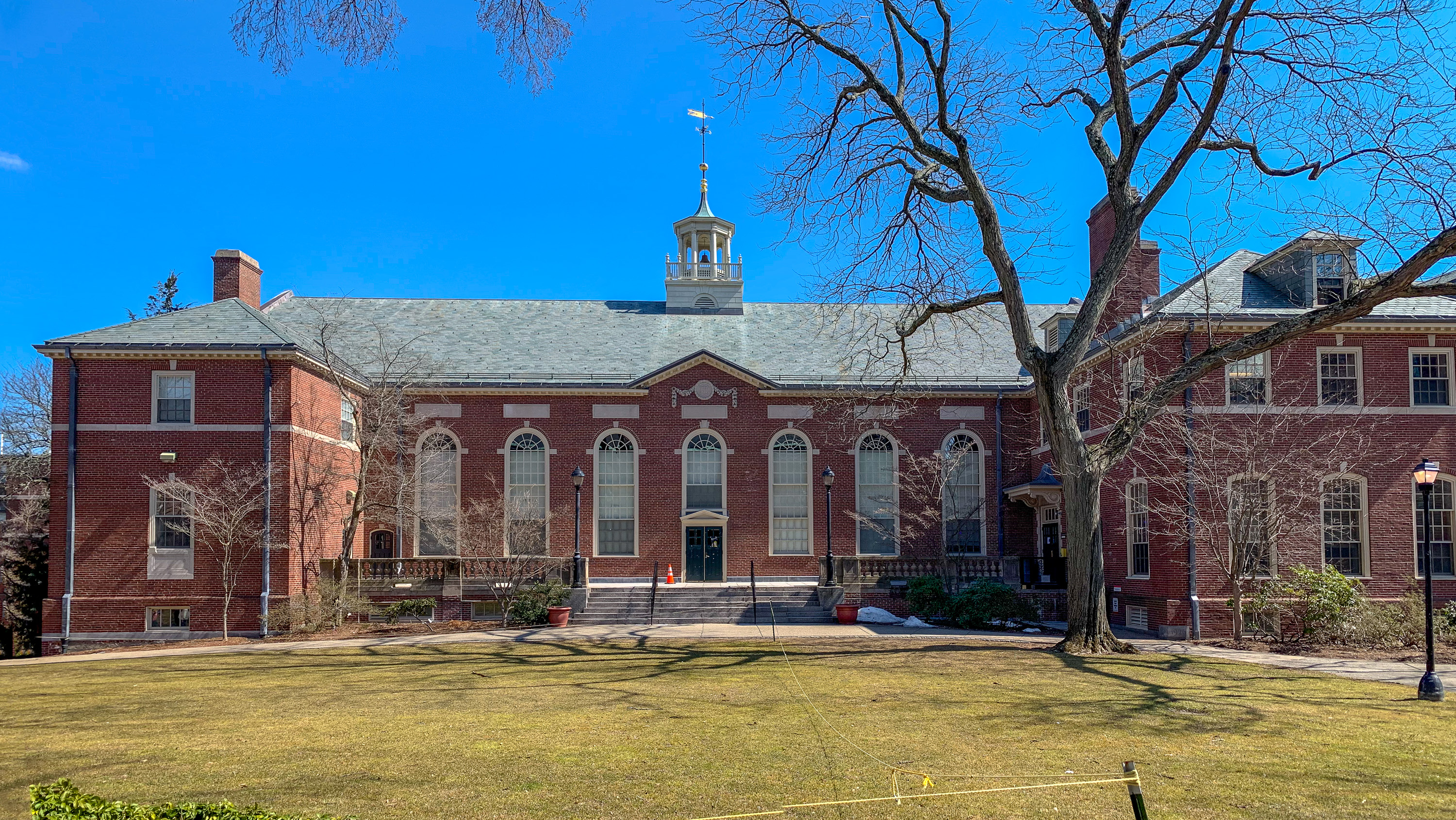
Alumnae Hall of Brown University, designed by Andrews, Jones, Biscoe & Whitmore in the Colonial Revival style and completed in 1927

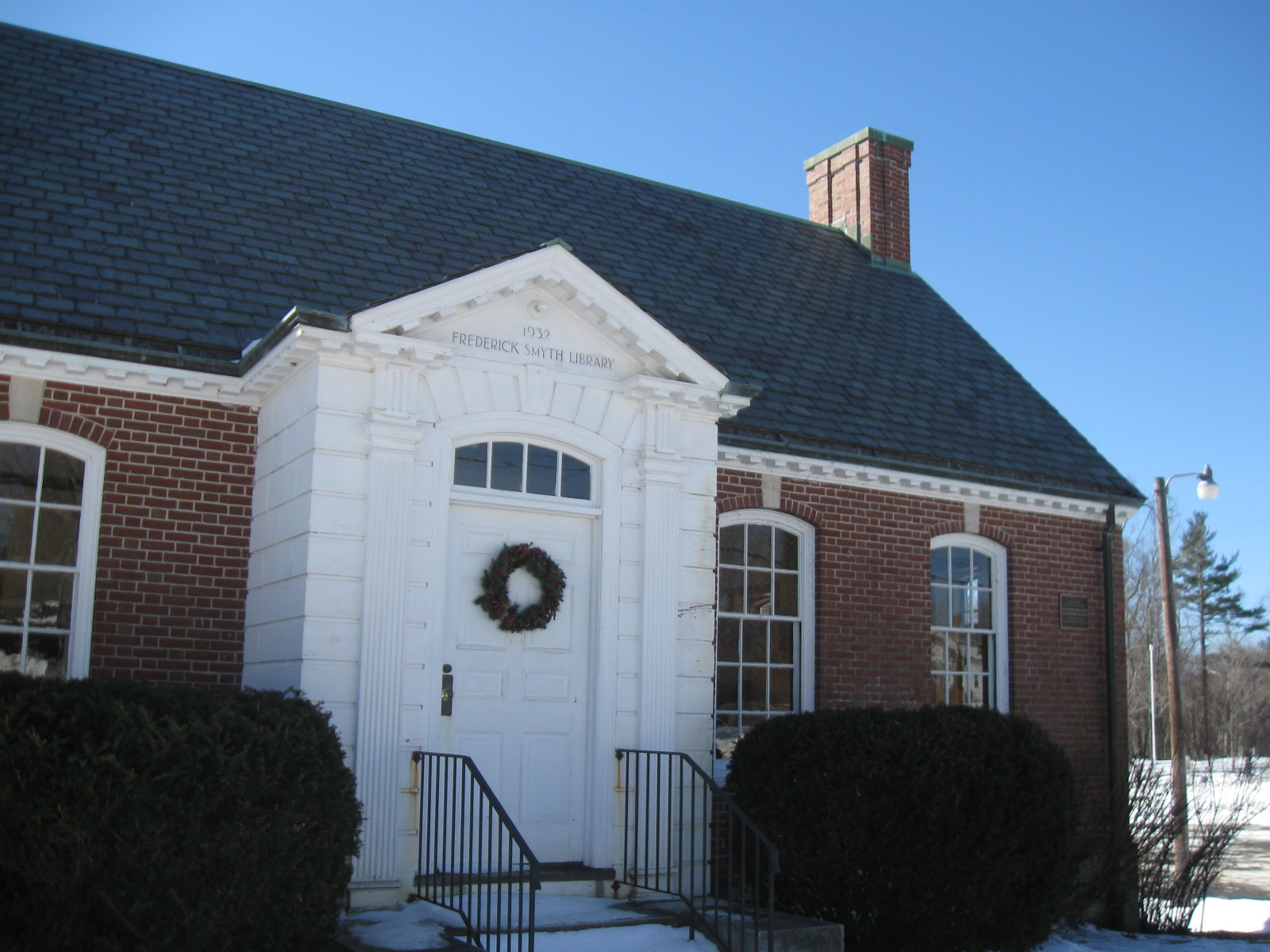
The former Smyth Public Library in Candia, New Hampshire, designed by Andrews, Jones, Biscoe & Whitmore in the Colonial Revival style and completed in 1932

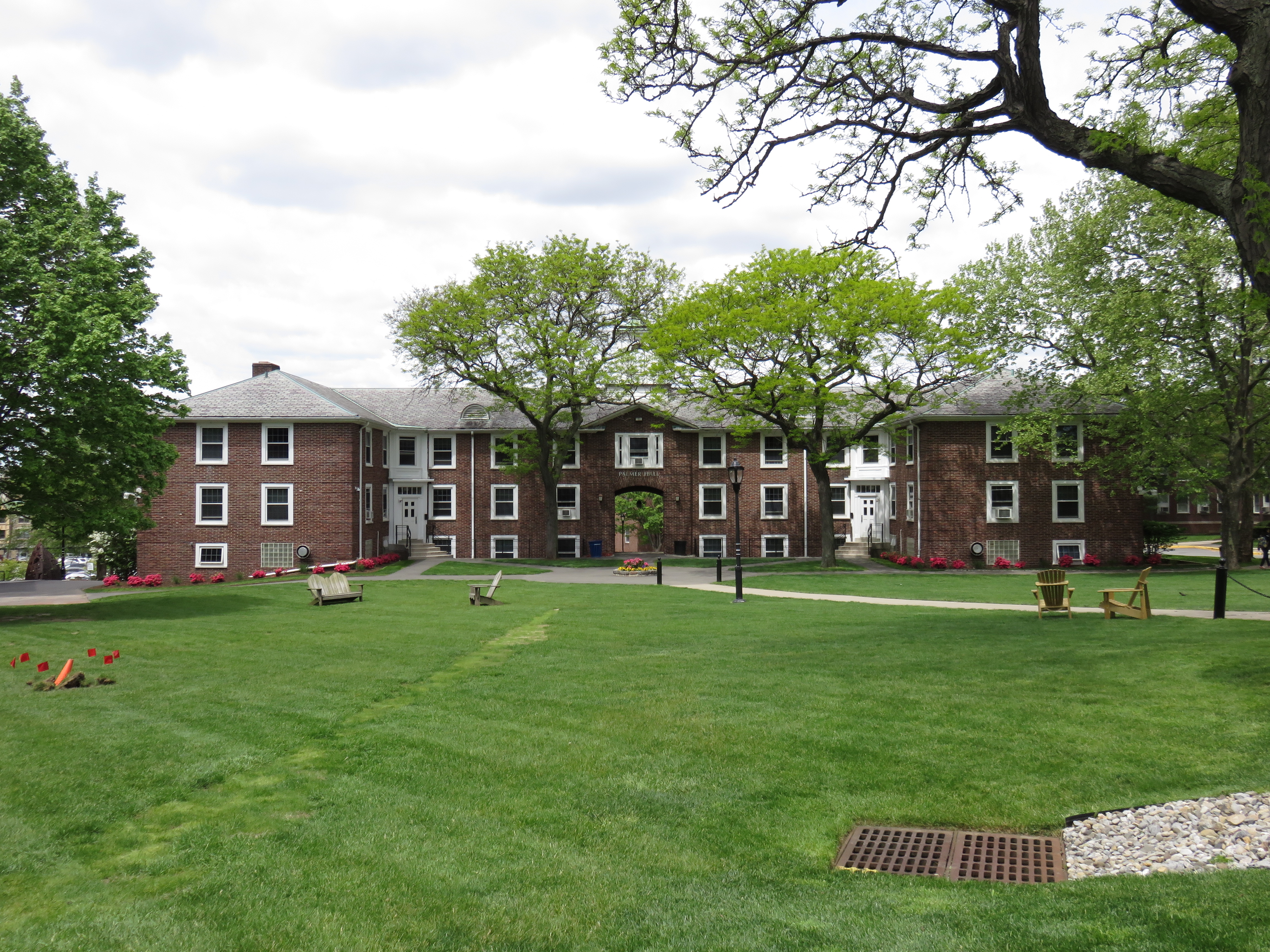
Palmer Hall of the Stevens Institute of Technology, designed by Andrews, Jones, Biscoe & Whitmore in the Colonial Revival style and completed in 1937

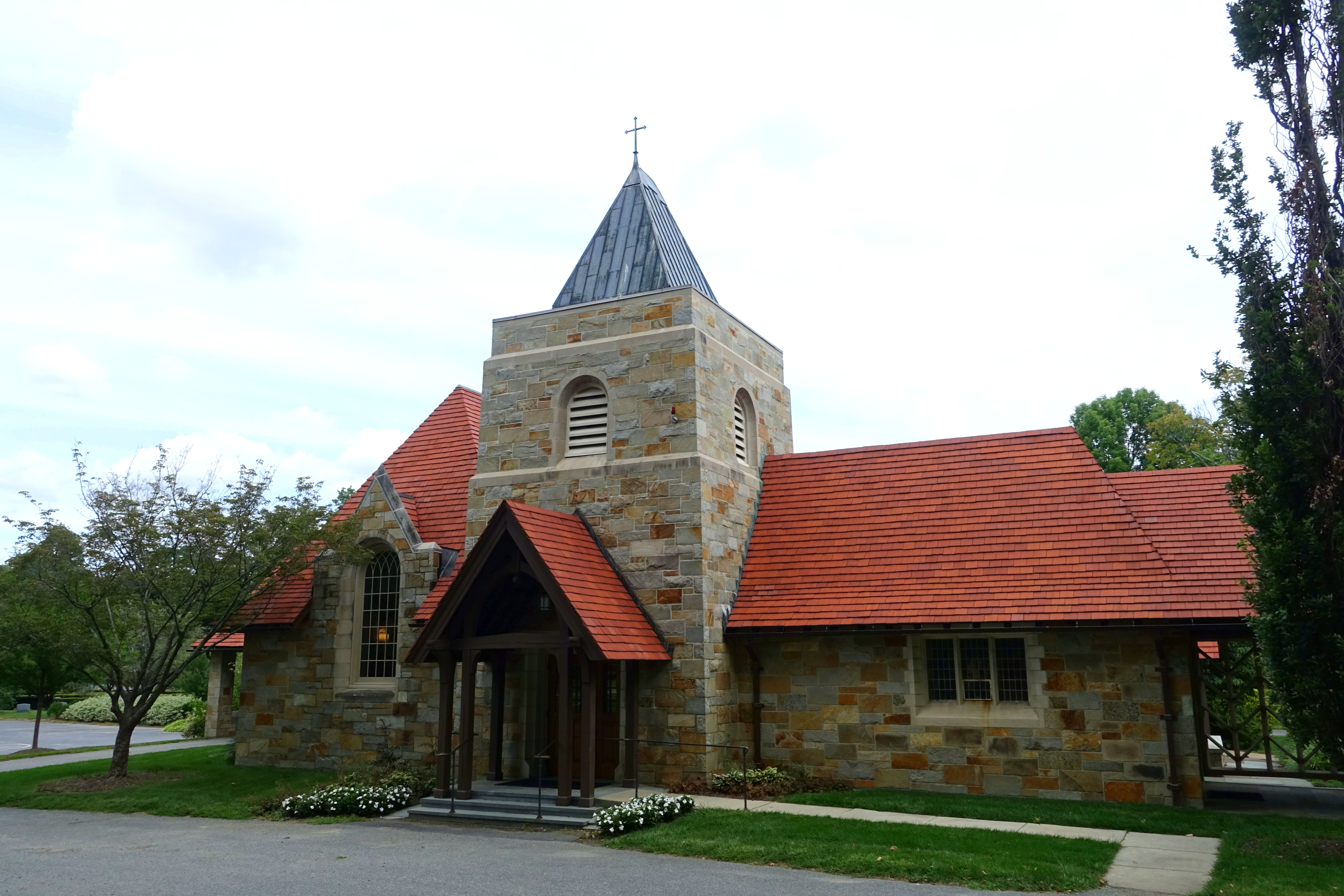
The chapel in Newton Cemetery, designed by Andrews, Jones, Biscoe & Whitmore in the Byzantine Revival style and completed in 1941

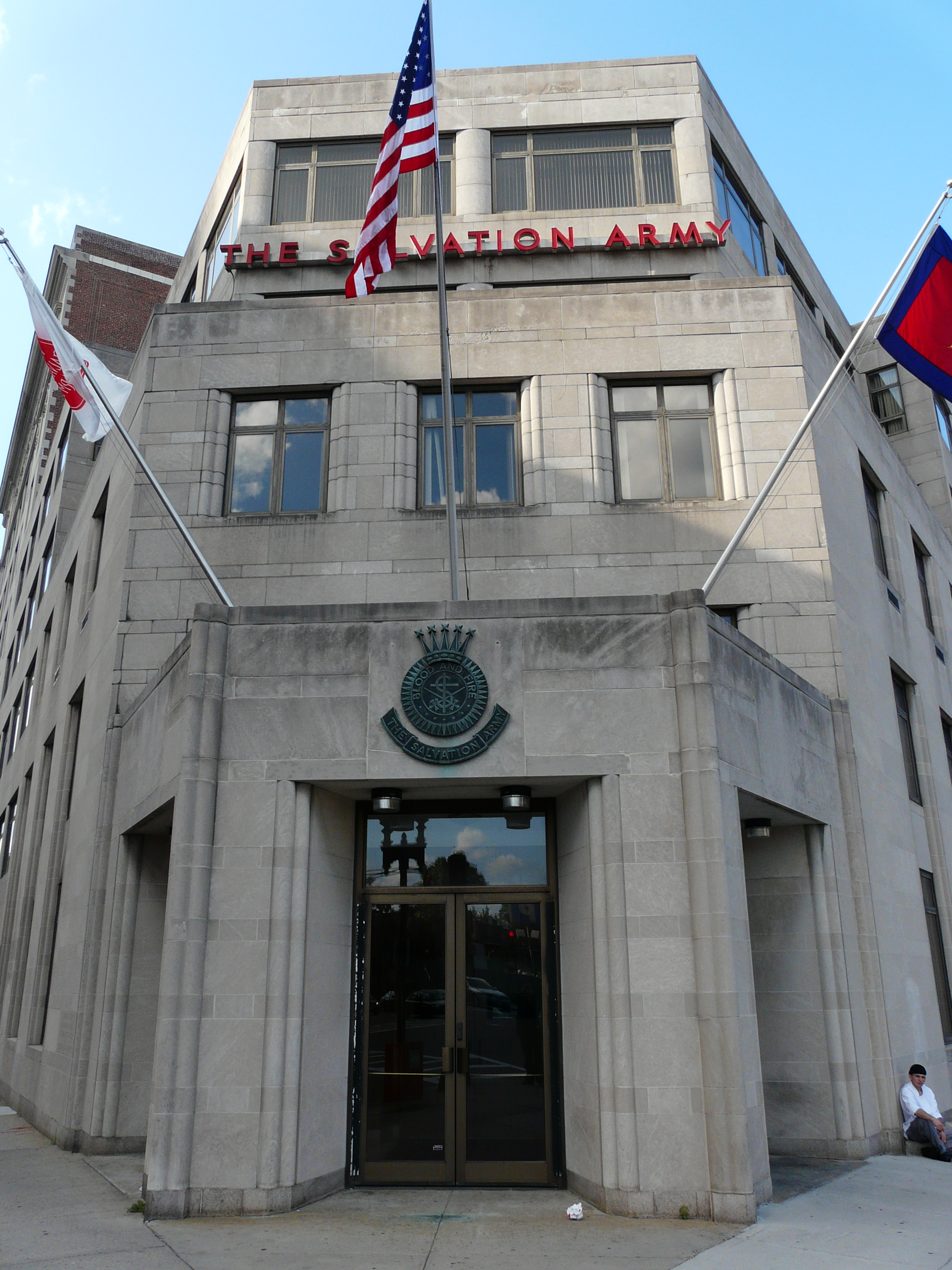
The former Salvation Army Building in Boston, designed by Andrews, Jones, Biscoe & Goodell in the Moderne style and completed in 1950

Andrews, Jaques & Rantoul was an American architectural firm founded in Boston, Massachusetts in 1883 and composed of architects Robert Day Andrews, Herbert Jaques and Augustus Neal Rantoul. The firm, with its successors, was in business continuously from 1883 to 1970, for a total of eighty-seven years of architectural practice.

== History ==
The firm was established in July 1883 as Andrews & Jaques by Robert Day Andrews (1857–1928) and Herbert Jaques (1857–1916). Both architects had graduated from the Massachusetts Institute of Technology in 1877 and spent several years in the office and studio of Henry Hobson Richardson. In 1887 they were joined by Angustus N. Rantoul (1865–1934). When Rantoul joined the partnership in 1889, the firm became Andrews, Jaques & Rantoul.

The partnership structure was unchanged until Jaques retired in 1909, with his share of the firm taken over by Howland Jones (1868–1959). When Jaques died in 1916 the firm was renamed Andrews, Rantoul & Jones. In 1924 Rantoul retired and Maurice B. Biscoe (1871–1953) and John Whitmore (1893–1943) became partners in the reorganized Andrews, Jones, Biscoe & Whitmore.

Andrews died in 1928, though the name of the firm was not changed. Whitmore died in 1943, and Edwin B. Goodell Jr. (1893–1970) became partner in the firm, which became Andrews, Jones, Biscoe & Goodell. Biscoe died in 1953, and Jones retired in 1955. Goodell continued to practice under his own name until his death in 1970.

In 1888 the firm established a western office in Denver, Colorado, moving it to Chicago in 1892. It was closed not long afterwards.

== Legacy ==
The firm designed numerous buildings that are listed on the U.S. National Register of Historic Places. Despite many listings as Andrews, Jacques & Rantoul, even during the years they operated, the firm name is correctly spelled: Andrews, Jaques & Rantoul.

== Architectural works ==
=== Boston and Massachusetts ===
- 1887 — William Brewster house, Cambridge
  - A contributing resource to the NRHP-listed Old Cambridge Historic District.
- 1887 — Richard Henry Dana III house, Cambridge
  - A contributing resource to the NRHP-listed Old Cambridge Historic District.
- 1889 — Robert C. Hooper house, Boston
  - A contributing resource to the NRHP-listed Back Bay Historic District.
- 1889 — Josiah Royce house, Cambridge
  - The home of Julia Child from 1961 until 2001. A contributing resource to the NRHP-listed Shady Hill Historic District.
- 1890 — Roughwood, Chestnut Hill
  - Acquired by Pine Manor College in 1961, which is now Messina College of Boston University. NRHP-listed.
- 1892 — Boston Lying-in Hospital, Boston
  - Demolished.
- 1893 — Paine Estate, Chestnut Hill
  - NRHP-listed.
- 1893 — Bunkio Matsuki house, Salem
  - Known as the "Japanese House" for its original owner and its distinctive style.
- 1895 — Brookline High School, Brookline
  - Destroyed by fire in 1936.
- 1898 — Godfrey Lowell Cabot house, Cambridge
- 1898 — Worcester County Courthouse, Worcester
  - NRHP-listed, also a contributing resource to the NRHP-listed Institutional District.
- 1899 — Newton Centre United Methodist Church (former), Newton Centre
- 1900 — Lorin F. Deland and Margaret Deland house, Boston
- 1900 — Muller Building, Boston
  - A contributing resource to the NRHP-listed Custom House District.
- 1900 — Henry Woods High School (former), Barre
  - As of 2025, the Henry Woods Municipal Building.
- 1901 — Jamaica Plain High School (former), Jamaica Plain
  - A contributing resource to the NRHP-listed Sumner Hill Historic District.
- 1902 — State Mutual Life Assurance Company Building, Boston
  - As of 2025, an office building known by its address, 50 Congress Street.
- 1905 — Robert Day Andrews house, Brookline
  - Home of the architect. A contributing resource to the NRHP-listed Fisher Hill Historic District.
- 1905 — House of the Good Samaritan, Boston
  - Demolished in 1979.
- 1906 — Haverhill Armory (former), Haverhill
  - As of 2025, the Haverhill Firefighting Museum.
- 1907 — Charlestown Armory (former), Charlestown
- 1908 — Hornblower & Weeks building, Boston
- 1911 — Peerless Motor Car Company building, Boston
  - The base of the Boston Citgo sign.
- 1912 — Nahant Town Hall, Nahant
  - A contributing resource to the NRHP-listed Nahant Civic Historic District.
- 1913 — Dexter Building, Boston
- 1917 — F. Jewett Moore house, Cambridge
  - As of 2025, home to the Theta Delta Chi fraternity.
- 1921 — William L. S. Brayton house, Fall River
  - As of 2025, the Fall River School Administration Building.
- 1921 — Ipswich Memorial Hall, Ipswich
- 1922 — Bancroft School (former), Worcester
  - Later home to Becker College until its closure in 2021.
- 1926 — Blakeley Hall, Tufts University, Medford
- 1927 — Braker Hall, Tufts University, Medford
- 1928 — Stratton Hall, Tufts University, Somerville
- 1929 — Alpha Delta Phi fraternity house (former), Amherst
  - As of 2025, Hitchcock Residence Hall of Amherst College.
- 1932 — Cousens Gymnasium, Tufts University, Medford
  - This project was submitted for exhibition in the architecture event in the art competition at the 1932 Summer Olympics.
- 1934 — Salem Public Library North Branch (former), Salem
  - Closed in 1977. As of 2025, offices.
- 1938 — Winslow Academic Center, Lasell University, Auburndale
- 1941 — Memorial Chapel, Newton Cemetery, Newton Centre
- 1950 — Salvation Army Building, Boston
  - Demolished in 2011 for the Liberty Mutual Tower.
- 1954 — Memorial Spaulding School, Oak Hill

=== Elsewhere in New England ===
- 1888 — Emmanuel Church, Dublin, New Hampshire
- 1890 — Gov. Frank West Rollins House, Concord, New Hampshire
  - NRHP-listed.
- 1891 — Stephen O. Metcalf house, Providence, Rhode Island
  - Since 1953, home to the presidents of the Rhode Island School of Design.
- 1893 — Brown Library, Seabrook, New Hampshire
  - In 1994, moved to the site of the new Seabrook Public Library, to which it was attached.
- 1901 — Gymnasium (former), University of Vermont, Burlington, Vermont
  - As of 2025, the Royall Tyler Theatre.
- 1903 — La Rochelle, Bar Harbor, Maine
  - Built as a summer home for George S. Bowdoin. As of 2025, the museum of the Bar Harbor Historical Society. A contributing resource to the NRHP-listed West Street Historic District.
- 1904 — Hartford Club, Hartford, Connecticut
  - NRHP-listed.
- 1904 — Nannau, Bar Harbor, Maine
  - Built as a summer home for David R. Ogden. NRHP-listed.
- 1908 — George C. F. Williams house, Hartford, Connecticut
  - Enlarged in 1916 by Smith & Bassette. Since 1945, the Connecticut Governor's Residence. A contributing resource to the NRHP-listed Prospect Avenue Historic District.
- 1909 — Hulls Cove High School, Bar Harbor, Maine
  - NRHP-listed.
- 1910 — Miller Hall, Brown University, Providence, Rhode Island
  - The firm's three buildings at Brown University were originally built for the use of Pembroke College, its coordinate college for women.
- 1911 — Oak Hill School, Hartford, Connecticut
  - Until 1952 known as the Connecticut Institute for the Blind.
- 1919 — Metcalf Hall, Brown University, Providence, Rhode Island
- 1927 — Alumnae Hall, Brown University, Providence, Rhode Island
- 1927 — Plantations Club (former), Providence, Rhode Island
  - Originally a women's club, named for the historic Providence Plantations. As of 2025, Wales Hall of Johnson & Wales University.
- 1929 — Taylor Library, East Derry, New Hampshire
- 1932 — Smyth Public Library (former), Candia, New Hampshire
  - NRHP-listed.

=== Elsewhere in the United States ===
- 1888 — Westport Library, Westport, New York
- 1890 — Boston Building, Denver
  - NRHP-listed.
- 1891 — Equitable Building, Des Moines, Iowa
  - Known as the Bankers Trust Building after the completion of the second Equitable Building in 1924. Demolished.
- 1891 — Montgomery Building, Milwaukee
  - Demolished.
- 1892 — Equitable Building, Denver
  - NRHP-listed.
- 1894 — N. P. Coburn Library, Colorado College, Colorado Springs, Colorado
  - Demolished in 1962.
- 1896 — Children's Hospital of Michigan, Detroit
  - Demolished in 1971.
- 1904 — Palmer Hall, Colorado College, Colorado Springs, Colorado
  - NRHP-listed.
- 1908 — Taylor House, Columbia, South Carolina
  - From 1950 to 1998, the Columbia Museum of Art. As of 2025, part of the Joseph F. Rice School of Law of the University of South Carolina. NRHP-listed.
- 1918 — Locke Ledge, Yorktown Heights, New York
  - The estate of Lydia Locke and her then-husband Arthur Hudson Marks. Destroyed by fire in 1966.
- 1937 — Palmer Hall, Stevens Institute of Technology, Hoboken, New Jersey
