= Robert Andrews (architect) =

American architect (1857–1928)

Robert D. Andrews
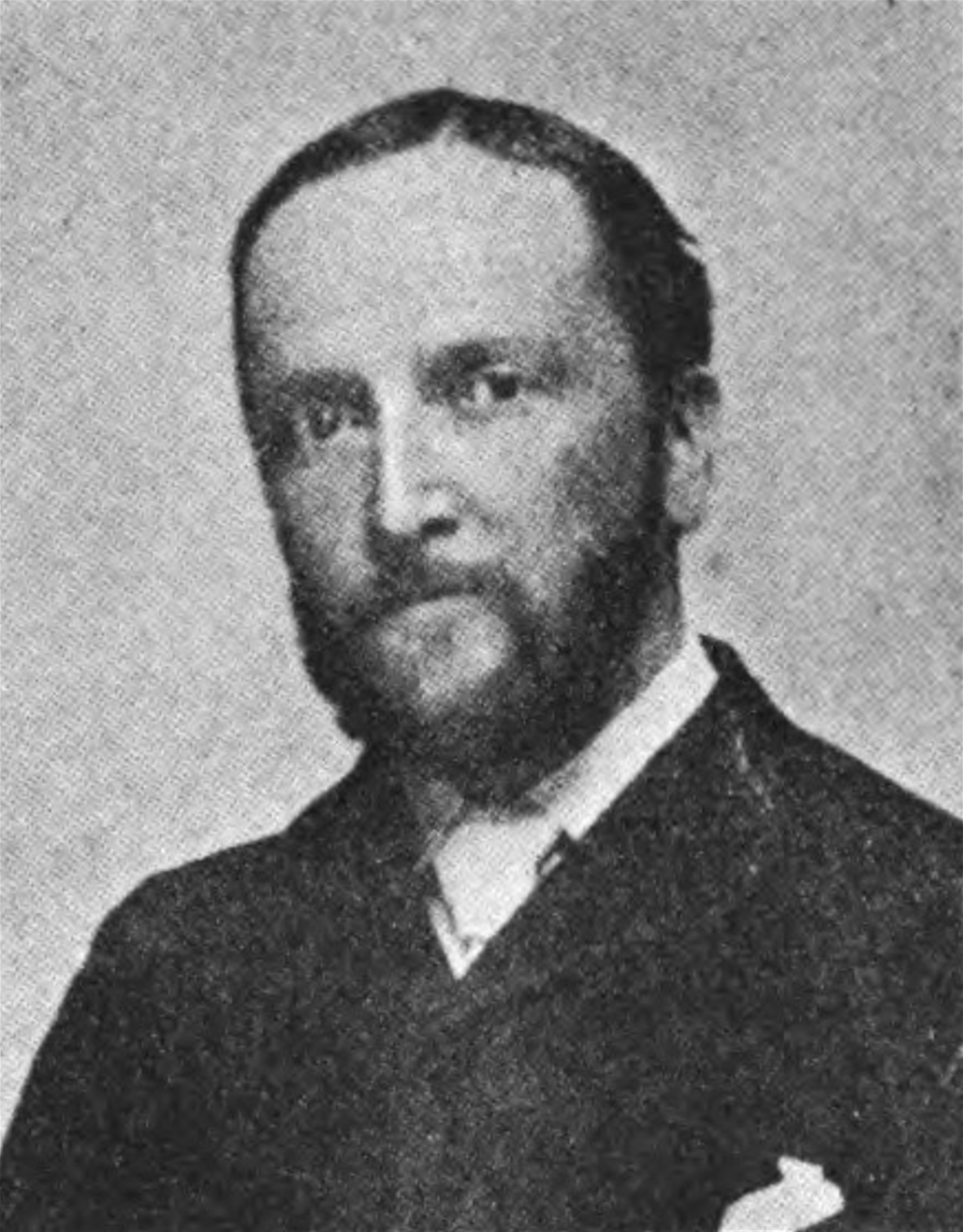
- Robert D. Andrews, c. 1910
- Born: March 5, 1857; Hartford, Connecticut, U.S.
- Died: September 19, 1928 (aged 71); Boston, Massachusetts, U.S.
- Occupation: Architect
- Practice: Andrews, Jaques & Rantoul

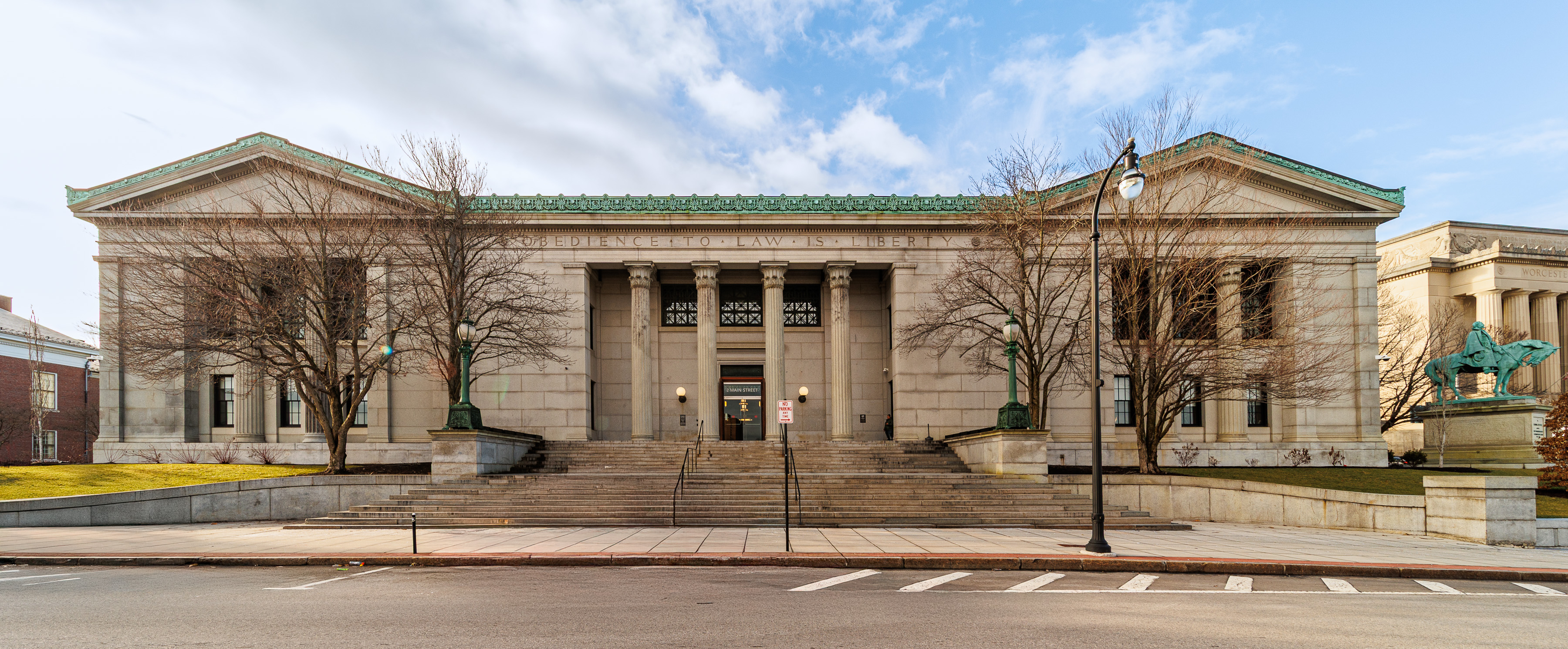
The former Worcester County Courthouse, designed in the Neoclassical style and completed in 1899.

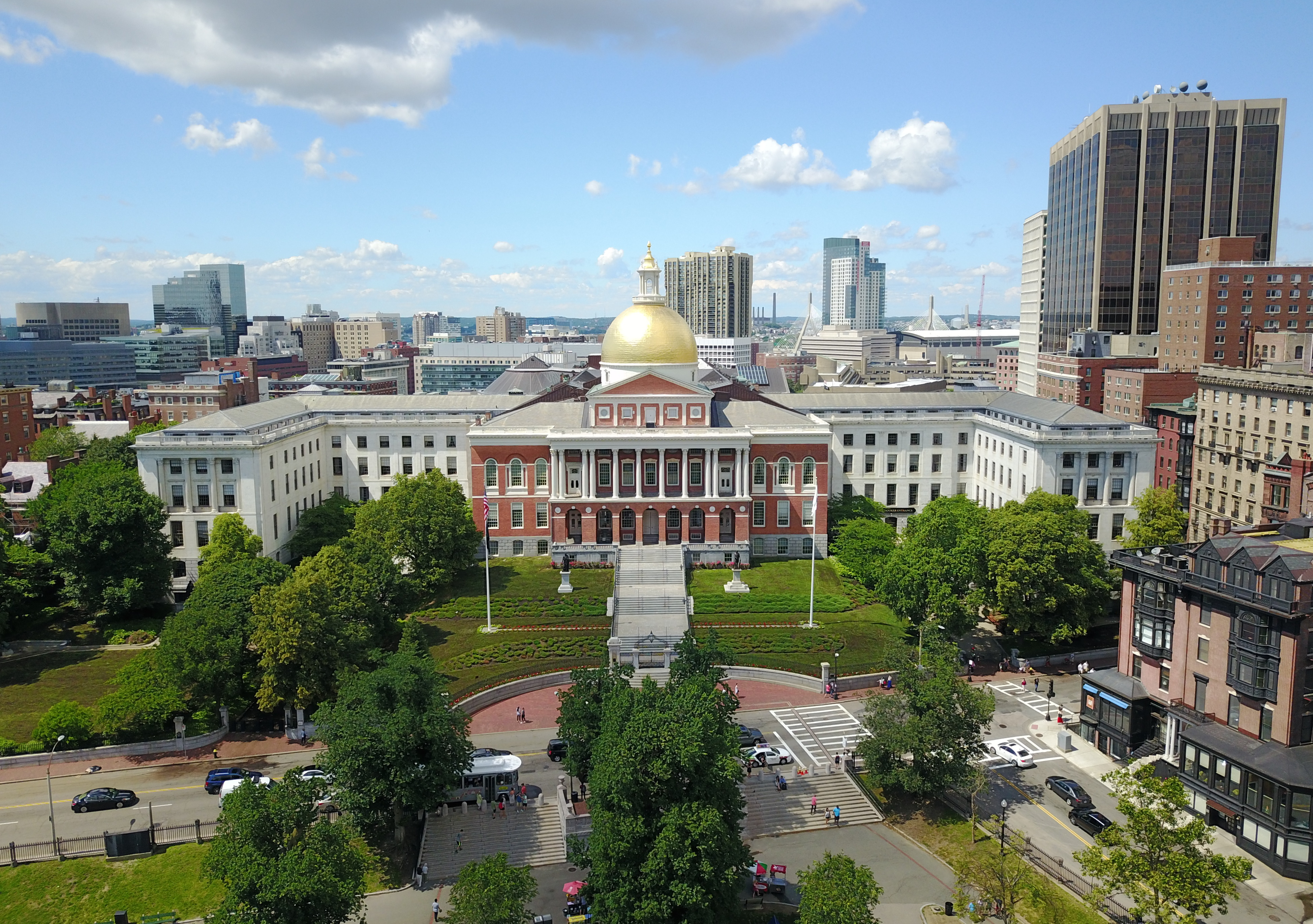
An aerial view of the Massachusetts State House. The Bulfinch building, restored by Everett and Andrews in 1898, at center, is flanked by the wings added by Andrews, Chapman and Sturgis in 1917.

Robert Day Andrews (March 5, 1857 – September 19, 1928) was an American architect and founder of the Boston architectural firm of Andrews, Jaques & Rantoul. Andrews was a key figure in the preservation and restoration of the Massachusetts State House and Old State House of Connecticut and was responsible for the expansion of the former building in 1917.

== Life and career ==
Robert Day Andrews was born March 5, 1857, in Hartford, Connecticut, to Samuel James Andrews, a prominent figure in the American Catholic Apostolic Church, and Catharine Andrews, née Day. From 1875 to 1876 he took a special course in architecture at the Massachusetts Institute of Technology, followed by training in various Boston architectural offices, including Peabody & Stearns, and in Europe. He joined the office of Henry Hobson Richardson after returning to the United States. In July 1883 he and a colleague, Herbert Jaques, formed the firm of Andrews & Jaques, architects. Six years later, with the addition of Augustus N. Rantoul, the firm became Andrews, Jaques & Rantoul.

In 1910, Andrews identified his important works as the former Coburn Library (1894) and Palmer Hall (1894) of Colorado College, the Equitable Buildings in Des Moines (1891) and Denver (1892), the Worcester County Courthouse (1899), the State Mutual Building (1902) in Boston and the Hartford Club (1904). Andrews was responsible for the inscription on the Worcester courthouse: "Obedience to Law is Liberty." Its inclusion in the completed building was somewhat accidental: Andrews had written the phrase as a placeholder on the firm's competition drawings, and it was perpetuated in a set of drawings issued for a cost estimate. It was ultimately executed after a longer inscription by Senator George F. Hoar could not be fit on the freize. Andrews' phrase has been perpetuated elsewhere, such as on the Cuyahoga County Courthouse (1912) in Cleveland. After the retirements of Jaques and Rantoul his partners were Howland Jones, Maurice B. Biscoe and John Whitmore. He was senior partner of this firm and its successors until his death, which occurred September 19, 1928, in Boston. By this time his firm was named Andrews, Jones, Biscoe & Whitmore.

Andrews was married in 1887 to Elizabeth Seaman and had five children. He was a Fellow of the American Institute of Architects (AIA) and a member of the Boston Society of Architects and Tavern Club.

== Major work ==
In 1896 Arthur Greene Everett, partner of Edward Clarke Cabot, was appointed architect to restore the Massachusetts State House (1898), originally designed by Charles Bulfinch and completed in 1798. To execute the project Everett associated himself with Andrews and Charles Amos Cummings, the latter as a consultant. The work, completed in time for the building's centennial, included an interior and exterior restoration as well as important structural and life safety improvements.

The restoration was roughly concurrent with the addition of the building's massive rear wing, designed by Charles Brigham. Despite this, before long the building was over capacity, and the legislature began considering plans for expansion. In 1912, in response to a proposal for a state office building which could overwhelm the Bulfinch building, Andrews independently proposed a pair of lateral wings, which received favorable comment in the Boston press. Andrews hoped that such wings would serve to create an appropriate setting for the Bulfinch building–in his words, "the saucer to the cup." The legislature was amenable to the proposal, and later that year Andrews was hired to prepare a formal proposal. He was joined in this by architects William Chapman and Richard Clipston Sturgis; of the three only Sturgis had no previous experience working on the building, Chapman having been associated with Brigham on the earlier extension. Construction on the two marble clad wings began in 1914 and was completed in 1917. In the 1820s the building had been painted white, and repainted yellow in the 1850s. Andrews successfully argued that the building be repainted white, rather than strip off the paint entirely, though he conceded that removing the paint would be more historically accurate. The paint was ultimately removed the year he died.

In 1917 Andrews, with Hartford architect H. Hilliard Smith, was appointed architect for the restoration of the Old State House (1920) in Hartford, Connecticut, attributed to Bulfinch and completed in 1796. Frank Miles Day was originally retained as a consultant though he died before construction began. Though the work was similar, the Hartford building was restored for use as a museum rather than as a working government building.

At the time of his death his firm was at work on several projects at Tufts University. Though not carried out until later, the largest of these was Cousens Gymnasium (1932). The firm submitted this project for the architecture event in the art competition at the 1932 Summer Olympics.
