= Hartford Club =

- U.S. National Register of Historic Places
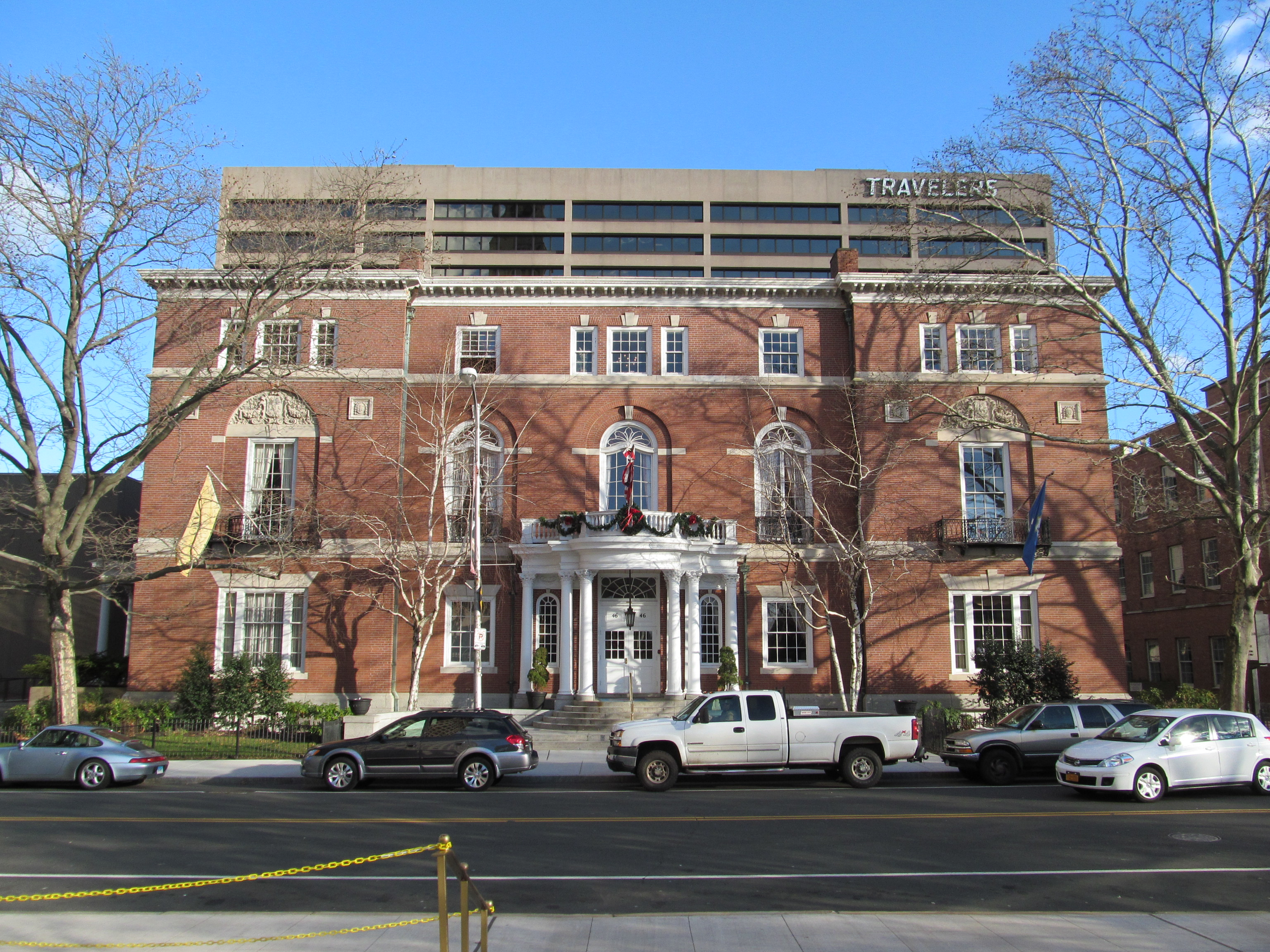
- Hartford Club

- Location within Connecticut Location within the United States
- Location: 46 Prospect Street, Hartford, Connecticut
- Coordinates: 41°45′51″N 72°40′19″W
- Area: 0.1 acres (0.040 ha)
- Built: 1903
- Architect: Andrews, Jaques & Rantoul
- Architectural style: Colonial Revival, Georgian Revival
- MPS: Hartford Downtown MRA
- NRHP reference No.: 84000779
- Added to NRHP: December 23, 1984

The Hartford Club is a private club at 46 Prospect Street in Hartford, Connecticut, founded in 1873.

The club is governed under laws for 501(c)(7) Social and Recreation Clubs; in 2024 it claimed $1,229,777 in total revenue and $781,966 in total assets.

== History ==
The Hartford Club began as a union of local men's clubs amalgamated due to financial woes. It began admitting women members in the 1970s. Its present clubhouse, located at 46 Prospect Street, was designed in 1901 by Robert D. Andrews of Andrews, Jaques & Rantoul and was completed in 1903. It opened on January 1, 1908.

The club provides dining rooms, private banquet and meeting rooms, concierge services for members, and members' activities.

Numerous prominent organizations in Greater Hartford ‒ like the Yale Club of Hartford ‒ have regularly hosted events at The Hartford Club since The Hartford Club was founded.

== Architecture ==
The clubhouse is located in downtown Hartford, on the east side of Prospect Street, across from the Travelers Tower and one block south of the Old State House. It is a three-story Georgian Revival building, slightly larger in size than domestic mansions of the period that were built in a similar style. It has a broad five-bay facade, with slightly projecting end bays. The ground-floor end windows are three-part Palladian style windows with narrow sidelights, and the center entrance has a series of elaborate projecting elements supported by Corinthian columns. Second-floor windows are set in openings with half-round tops set in recessed panels; the outer windows have the arched section filled with moulded decorative panels.

The clubhouse was listed on the National Register of Historic Places in 1984.

== Notable members ==
- Oliver Butterworth
- Edmund Ernest Cammack
- Louis R. Cheney
- Wilbur L. Cross
- Dominick Dunne
- Richard Hartford
- Katharine Hepburn
- George Keller
- Senator Joseph Lieberman
- John Pierpont Morgan
- Igor Sikorsky
- Wallace Stevens
- Mark Twain

== See also ==
- List of American gentlemen's clubs
- National Register of Historic Places listings in Hartford, Connecticut
