= Taylor House (Columbia, South Carolina) =

Historic house in South Carolina, United States

- U.S. National Register of Historic Places
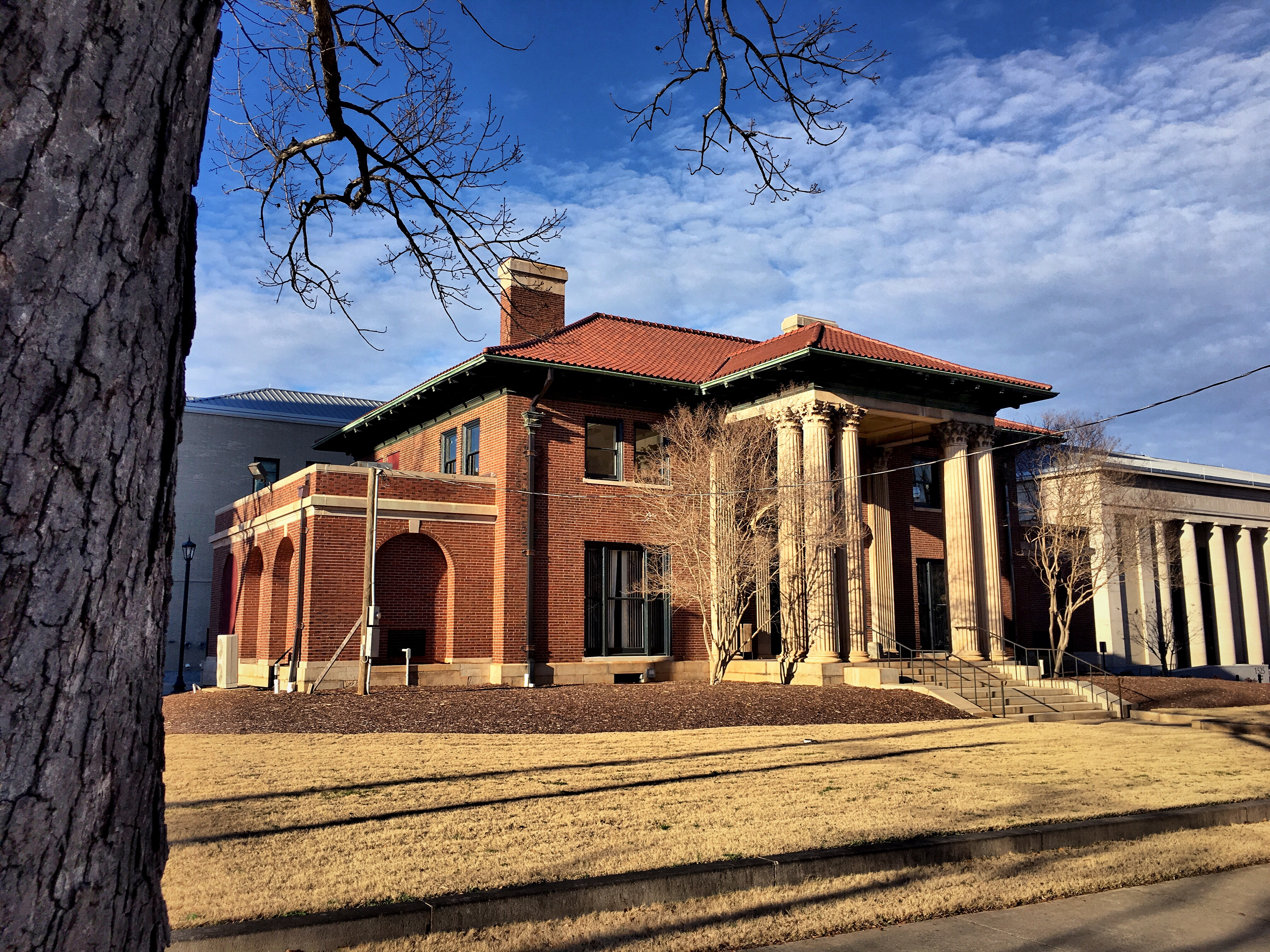

- Location within South Carolina Location within the United States
- Location: 1505 Senate St., Columbia, South Carolina
- Coordinates: 34°0′5″N 81°1′41″W
- Area: 1.4 acres (0.57 ha)
- Built: 1908
- Architect: Andrews, Jaques & Rantoul
- MPS: Columbia MRA
- NRHP reference No.: 82003903
- Added to NRHP: July 6, 1982

Taylor House, also known as the former home of the Columbia Museum of Art, is a historic home located in Columbia, South Carolina. It was designed by the architectural firm of Andrews, Jaques & Rantoul and built in 1908, as a two-story, L-shaped, brick Neo-Classical style mansion. The front facade features a projecting portico supported by large, fluted limestone Corinthian order columns. It was built for Thomas Taylor, Jr., who served as president of Taylor Manufacturing Company.

In 1950, the Columbia Museum of Art converted the house for use as a museum, adding three wings, and with the original stables joined to the main house by the Science Museum wing.

It was added to the National Register of Historic Places in 1982.
