= Samuel James Andrews =

- Born: July 31, 1817
- Died: October 11, 1906 (aged 89)

Samuel James Andrews (July 31, 1817 in Danbury, Connecticut – October 11, 1906 in Hartford, Connecticut) was an Irvingite divine.

He graduated from Williams College in 1839 and practiced law for some years, but turned his attention to theology, and was a Congregational clergyman from 1848 to 1855. In 1856 he became pastor of the Catholic and Apostolic Church (Irvingite) at Hartford, Connecticut.

He was married to Catharine Day. Their children included Robert Day Andrews, a prominent Boston architect.

== Works ==
Andrews's publications include:

- Sufferings of Union Soldiers in Southern Prisons: Transcript of Andersonville Trial (1870)
- God's Revelations of Himself to Men (1885)
- Life of our Lord upon the Earth, Considered in its Historical, Chronological, and Geographical Relations (New York, 1863; new and wholly revised edition, 1891)
- Christianity and Anti-Christianity in their Final Conflict (1898)
- The Church and its Organic Ministry (1899)
- God's Revelations of Himself to Men (1901)
