= Howland Jones =

American architect

I. Howland Jones
- Born: May 22, 1868; Boston, Massachusetts, United States
- Died: October 22, 1959 (aged 91); Marblehead, Massachusetts, United States
- Occupation: Architect
- Practice: Andrews, Jaques & Rantoul

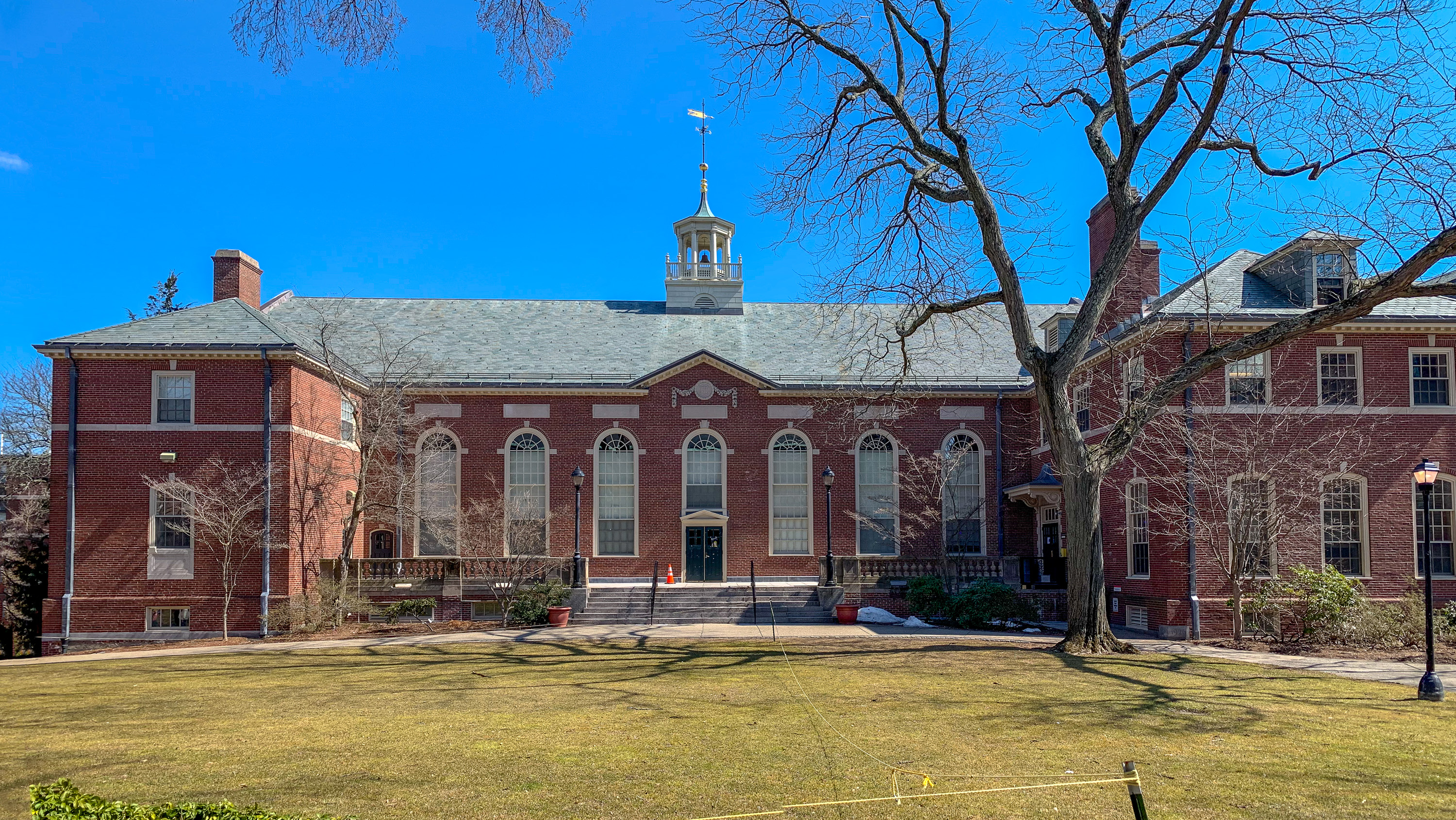
Alumnae Hall of Brown University, designed by Jones in the Colonial Revival style and completed in 1927.

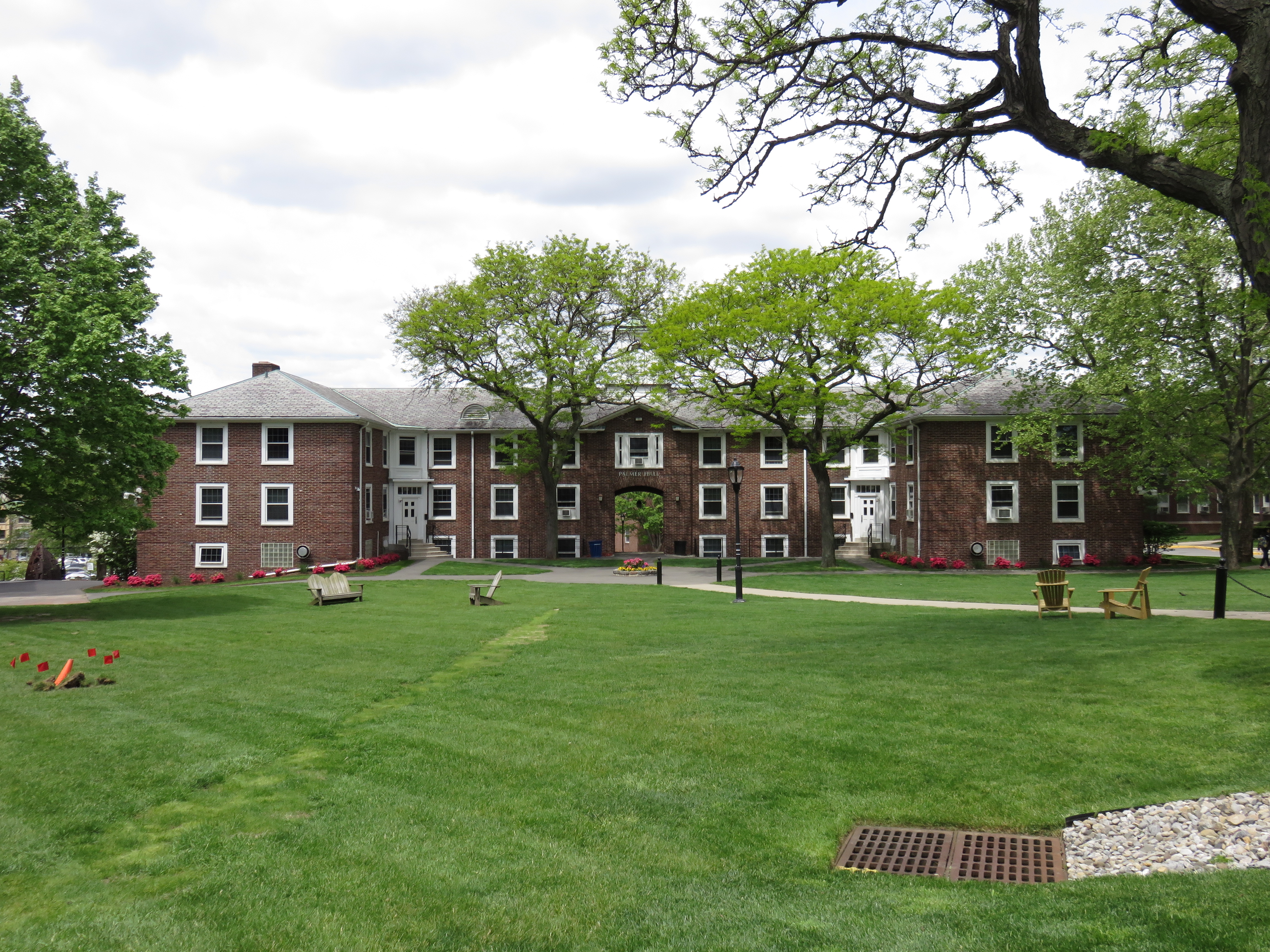
Palmer Hall of the Stevens Institute of Technology, designed by Jones in the Colonial Revival style and completed in 1937.

I. Howland Jones (May 22, 1868 – October 22, 1959) was an American architect. He spent nearly his entire career with the Boston architectural firm best known as Andrews, Jaques & Rantoul; after 1928 he was senior partner of its successor firms: Andrews, Jones, Biscoe & Whitmore and Andrews, Jones, Biscoe & Goodell.

== Life and career ==
Ichabod Howland Jones was born May 22, 1868, in Boston to Henry A. Jones and Mary Jones, née Cranston. He planned to study architecture at the Massachusetts Institute of Technology, but was unable to do so due to an eye injury. After a year of recovery, he entered the office of Boston architect H. Langford Warren as a student. After two or three years with Warren he worked as a drafter for several Boston architects, including William G. Preston, for whom he superintended work in Savannah, Georgia. During this period he completed several buildings, including the now demolished St. Chrysostom's Episcopal Church (1894), in Wollaston, Quincy, where he lived with his parents. In the summer of 1894 he left for Europe, and for two years studied the architecture of Italy, Greece and France. Upon his return to the United States he joined the firm of Peabody & Stearns, Boston's leading architects. In 1898 he moved to that of Andrews, Jaques & Rantoul and was involved in their successful competition entry for the Worcester County Courthouse (1899). In 1899 he established an independent practice, Jones & Hart, with Donald P. Hart. This firm was responsible for the Wollaston Fire Station (1901) in Quincy, but was apparently unsuccessful otherwise. Shortly thereafter he returned to Andrews, Jaques & Rantoul, where he emerged as the firm's chief designer. In 1909 one of the partners, Herbert Jaques, retired, and Jones acquired his interest in the firm. After Jaques' death the firm was renamed first Andrews, Rantoul & Jones and second Andrews, Jones, Biscoe & Whitmore. After Andrews' death in 1928 he became senior member of the firm, working in partnership with Maurice B. Biscoe and John Whitmore.

During Andrews' lifetime, Jones' major works included the Worcester Trust Company Building (1910) and Peerless Motor Car Company building (1911) in Boston, the Ipswich Memorial Hall (1921) in Ipswich, Braker Hall (1926) of Tufts University and Alumnae Hall (1927) of Brown University. With Andrews he designed the Oneida Football Club Monument (1925) on the Boston Common. After Andrews' death, major works included Cousens Gymnasium (1932) of Tufts University, which the firm submitted in the architecture event in the art competition at the 1932 Summer Olympics, Palmer Hall (1937) of the Stevens Institute of Technology and the Winslow Academic Center (1938) of Lasell University. Jones was also one of a group of architects responsible for Newtowne Court (1938) in Cambridge, an early public housing development. In 1945, with Jones entering his late 70s, the firm was reorganized as Andrews, Jones, Biscoe & Goodell; he remained an active member of the firm into the 1950s.

== Personal life ==
In 1898 Jones was married to Alice McKenna Friend at the Church of the Advent. They divorced in 1912, Jones alleging infidelity. In 1913 he married second to Edith Katherine Ritchie, with whom he had one child, a daughter. He was a Fellow of the American Institute of Architects (AIA), a member of the Boston Society of Architects and a charter member of the Boston Architectural Club. He died October 22, 1959, at home in Marblehead.
