= Hulls Cove High School =

- U.S. National Register of Historic Places
- Location within Maine Location within the United States
- Location: Maine State Route 3, Hulls Cove, Maine
- Coordinates: 44°25′11″N 68°15′3″W
- Area: less than one acre
- Built: 1909
- Architect: Andrews, Jaques & Rantoul
- Architectural style: Shingle Style, Colonial Revival
- NRHP reference No.: 99000374
- Added to NRHP: March 25, 1999

The Hulls Cove High School is a historic former school building on Maine State Route 3 in the Hulls Cove village of Bar Harbor, Maine. It is locally distinctive for its architecture, having been designed by the firm of Andrews, Jaques & Rantoul, which was responsible for designing a number of Bar Harbor's large summer estates. The school was built in 1909 and was used until the 1940s, after which it was converted to a community center. It was listed on the National Register of Historic Places in 1999.

== Description and history ==
The Hulls Cove High School is set on the west side of Bar Harbor Road, a short way north of Hulls Cove and just south of the Church of Our Father. It is a single-story wood frame structure, with a hip roof, wood shingle siding, and a rubblestone foundation. The roof has flared eaves, a typical feature of Shingle style buildings designed by Andrews, Jaques & Rantoul. The main facade faces south, with a projecting central vestibule, whose doorway is flanked by fluted pilasters and topped by a fanlight window. Banks of sash windows line the main wall on either side, a feature repeated on the north side, where there is a brick chimney opposite the entrance. The building is topped by a square belfry with segmented-arch louvered openings, and a flared-eave pyramidal roof.

Hulls Cove was one of thirteen districts established by the town of Eden (later renamed Bar Harbor). The first school in the Hulls Cove district was built in 1863, funded by a native son. The present school building was built in 1909 to relieve crowding. It is not known how Andrews, Jaques & Rantoul came to be selected for its design. The school remained in use until the school system was consolidated in the 1940s, and now serves as a community center.

== See also ==
- National Register of Historic Places listings in Hancock County, Maine
