= E. E. Cammack =

- Born: Edmund Ernest Cammack; 7 December 1881; Spalding, Lincolnshire, England
- Died: 17 December 1958 (aged 77); Hartford, Connecticut, U.S.
- Education: University of London
- Spouse: Zelie Cammack
- Children: 1

Edmund Ernest Cammack FAIA FCAS (7 December 1881 – 17 December 1958) was an English actuary who was an early figure in the Aetna Life Insurance company and a founder member of the Casualty Actuarial Society of America.

Cammack made several contributions to actuarial journals and, as a renowned actuary, he was regularly asked to contribute to US Governmental debates. In 1926, he founded a graduate school that continues to this day at Aetna Life Insurance.

== Early life and education ==
Edmund Ernest Cammack was born in Spalding, Lincolnshire, England, on 7 December 1881. He was educated at Bedford Modern School and the University of London.

== Career ==
Cammack began his career working at a London bank before moving to Johannesburg to work as an actuary with the African Life Insurance Company. He was made a Fellow of the Actuarial Society of America in 1909 when he left South Africa to join Aetna Life Insurance in America. Cammack rose through the ranks to become Head Actuary in 1924 and proceeded to create its Group Insurance Division.

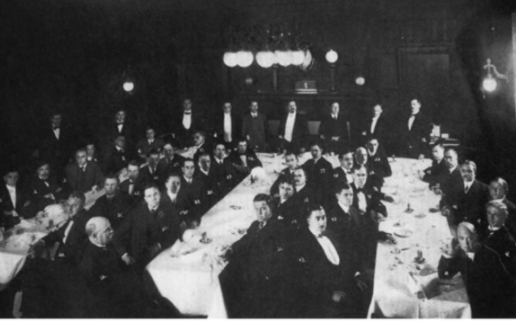
E.E. Cammack, First Dinner of the Casualty, Actuarial and Statistical Society of America, NYC, 7 November 1914

Cammack was elected Vice-President of Aetna and, in 1927, he was made Chief Executive of the fire and marine operations of the Aetna Life Affiliated Companies. Shortly thereafter he made important contributions to the 8th International Congress of Actuaries which was held in London in June, 1927. In 1947 he was appointed a director of Aetna Life and Aetna Casualty and served on both boards until his death in 1958.

Cammack was a Fellow and Charter Member of the Casualty Actuarial Society, which he helped to establish in 1914, later making several important contributions to its work. He was elected vice president of the Casualty Actuarial Society in 1922, and was made a Fellow of the American Institute of Actuaries in 1925. He served as a Member of the Actuarial Society of America and, in 1927, was made president of the Automobile Insurance Company of Hartford, Connecticut.

Cammack was a member of the Hartford Club, the Hartford Golf Club, the Wampanoag Country Club and was a communicant of St John's Episcopal Church in West Hartford.

== Death ==
Cammack and his wife, Zelie Cammack, had one son. Cammack died in Hartford, Connecticut, on 17 December 1958.

== Selected contributions to Actuarial Journals ==
- Premiums for Non-Participating Life Insurance, by E.E. Cammack, Transactions of the Actuarial Society of America, 1919
- Premiums and reserves for non-cancellable accident and health policies, by E.E. Cammack, Casualty Actuarial Society, 1921
- Combined Group Mortality Investigation, by E.E. Cammack, Journal of the Institute of Actuaries, November 1926
