= Sumner Hill Historic District =

Historic district in Massachusetts, United States

- U.S. National Register of Historic Places
- U.S. Historic district
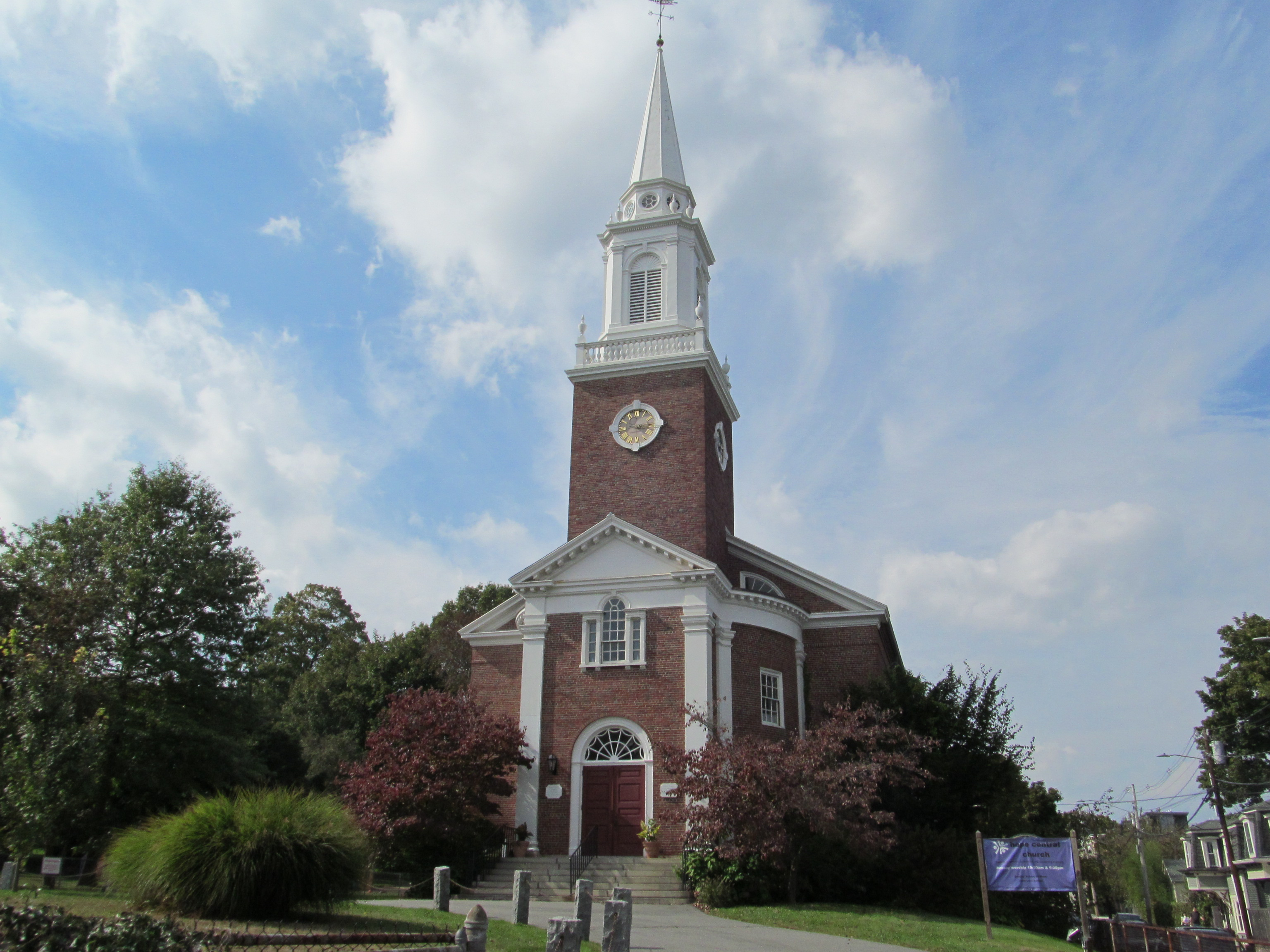
- Hope Central Church

- Location within Massachusetts Location within the United States
- Location: Jamaica Plain, Boston, Massachusetts
- Coordinates: 42°18′35″N 71°6′43″W
- Area: 365 acres (148 ha)
- Architect: Andrews, Jaques & Rantoul; et al.
- Architectural style: Second Empire, Italianate, Queen Anne
- NRHP reference No.: 87001889
- Added to NRHP: October 22, 1987

The Sumner Hill Historic District encompasses a predominantly residential area of high-quality late 19th-century residences in the Jamaica Plain neighborhood of Boston, Massachusetts. It is roughly bounded by Seaverns Avenue, Everett Street, Carolina Avenue, and Newbern Street just east of the neighborhoods commercial Centre Street area. The district features Second Empire, Italianate, and Queen Anne style architecture, and was listed on the National Register of Historic Places in 1987.

== Description and history ==
During the 17th and 18th-century colonial period, the Jamaica Plain area was a predominantly rural agricultural part of Roxbury (then not part of Boston), providing food for Boston. Portions were developed in the latter half of the 18th century as large country summer estates for wealthy Bostonians, including John Hancock, Francis Bernard, and Joshua Loring. The c. 1760 summer of house of Loring, now known as the Loring-Greenough House and located just outside the historic district, is one of the only houses in Jamaica Plain to survive from this period, and its estate grounds included the Sumner Hill area. In the second half of the 19th century, the advent of fast rail-based transportation into Boston led to the area's development as a streetcar suburb, and the estates were subdivided for development. Development of the Sumner Hill area was begun in the 1850s by the heirs of David Greenough, and went through a second major phase in the late 19th century. The first phase of development was characterized by the construction of large houses on handsome landscaped lots for the upper class, while the later development consisted of more densely built but still high quality housing for a more middle-class clientele.

The historic district is about 365 acres (148 ha) in size, and is roughly bounded by Centre Street, Seavern Avenue, Everett Street, and Carolina Street, although its actual boundaries exclude most of the buildings on these surrounding streets. The district's roadways are laid out to accommodate the area's hilly topography, winding around and along its features. Most of the buildings in the district are single-family residences of wood-frame construction, two to three stories in height. There are brick rowhouses along some of the outer roadways. The only non-residential buildings are three churches, which are clustered near the junctions of Elm Street with Revere Street and Seaverns Avenue in the northeastern part of the district, and the former Jamaica Plain High School just to their south on Elm Street. The latter building has been converted to residential use.

== See also ==
- National Register of Historic Places listings in southern Boston, Massachusetts
