= Worcester County Courthouse =

- Worcester Court House; Courthouse Lofts
- U.S. National Register of Historic Places
- U.S. Historic district – Contributing property
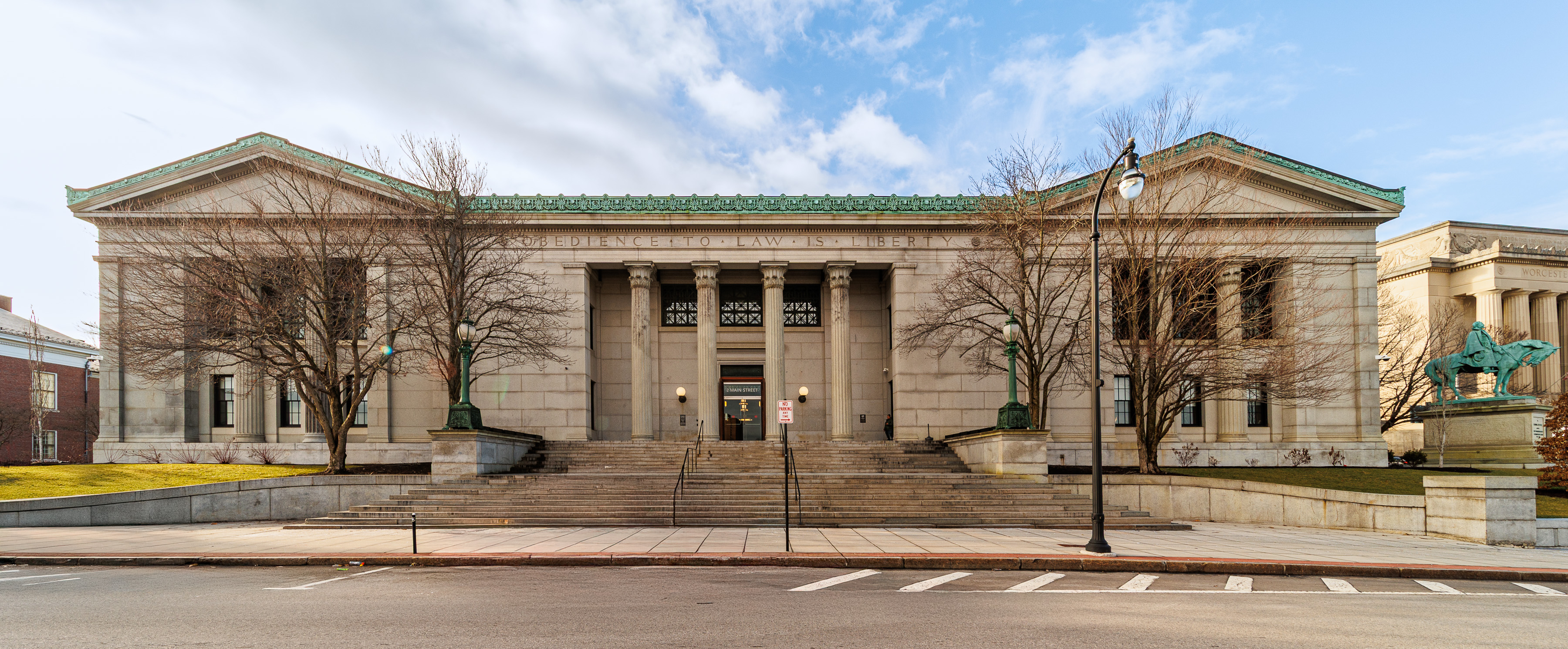
- The courthouse in 2023

- Location within Massachusetts
- Location: 2 Main St., Worcester, Massachusetts
- Coordinates: 42.2708°N 71.8°W
- Built: 1845
- Built by: Ammi B. Young (1845); Stephen C. Earle (1878 addition); Andrews, Jaques & Rantoul (1899 addition)
- Part of: Institutional District (ID80000554)
- NRHP reference No.: 100007236

Significant dates
- Added to NRHP: December 20, 2021
- Designated CP: March 5, 1980

The former Worcester County Courthouse (now the Courthouse Lofts) is a historic Greek Revival and Classical Revival building at 2 Main Street in Worcester, Massachusetts, in the Lincoln Square district and within the historic Institutional District. It was individually listed on the National Register of Historic Places in 2021.

== History ==
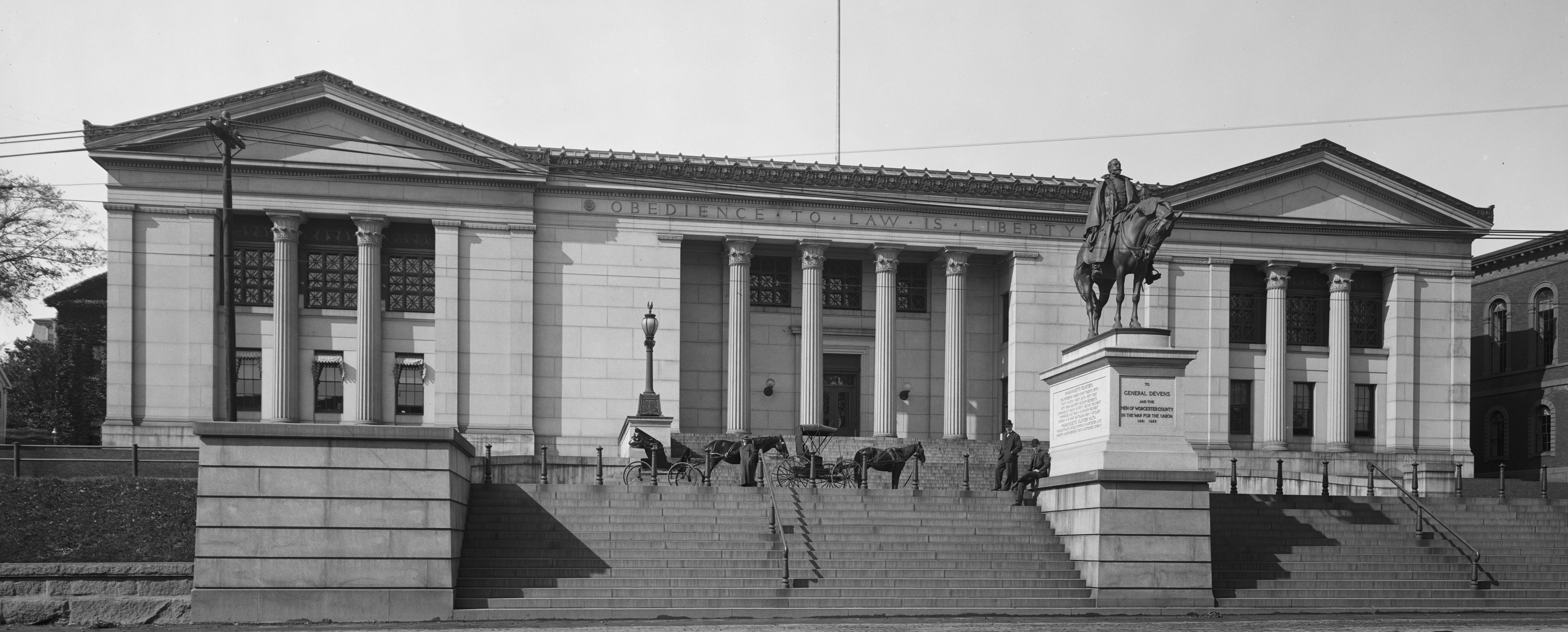
The courthouse c. 1908 with statue of Civil War General Charles Devens

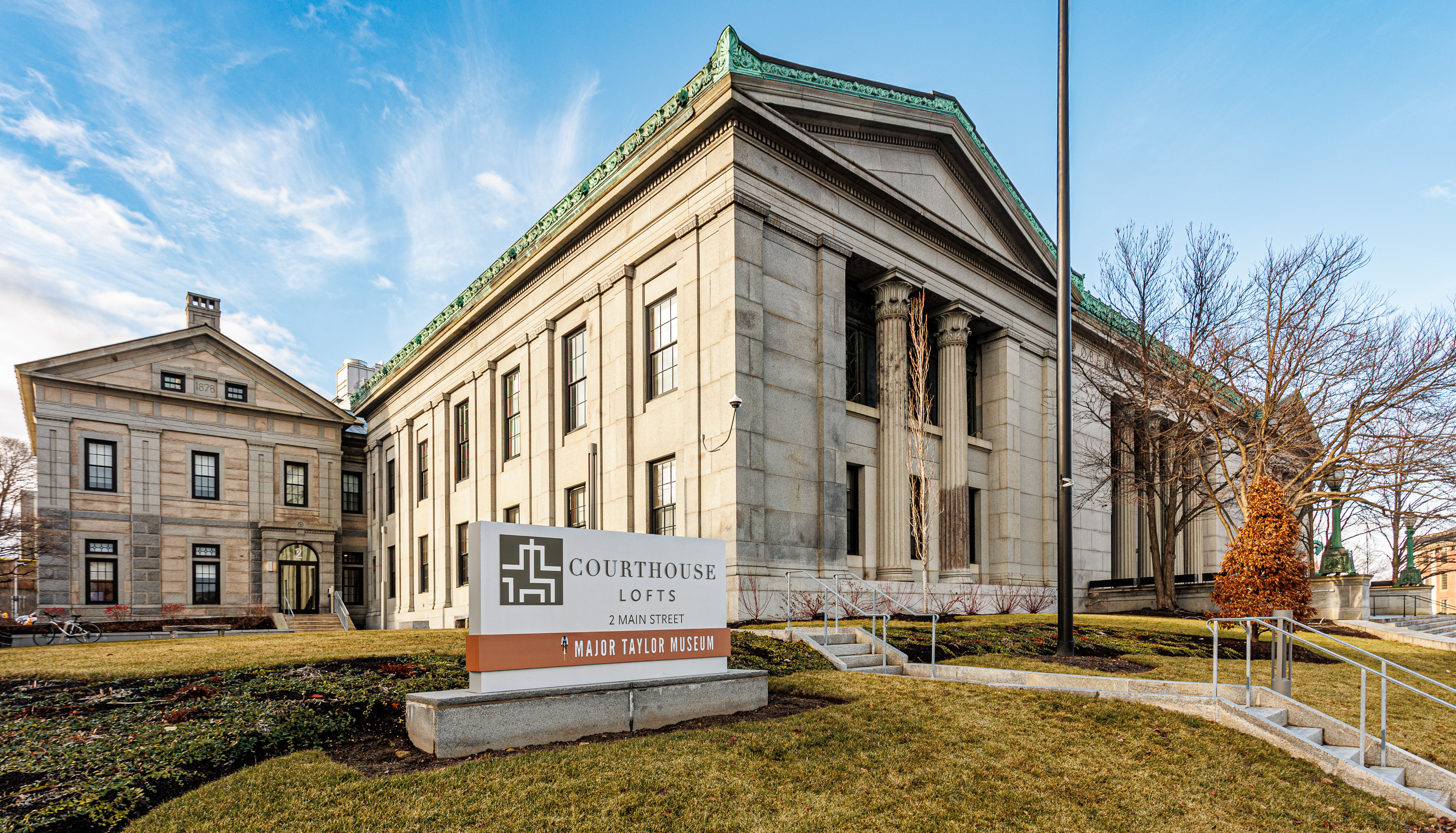
Courthouse Lofts and Major Taylor Museum

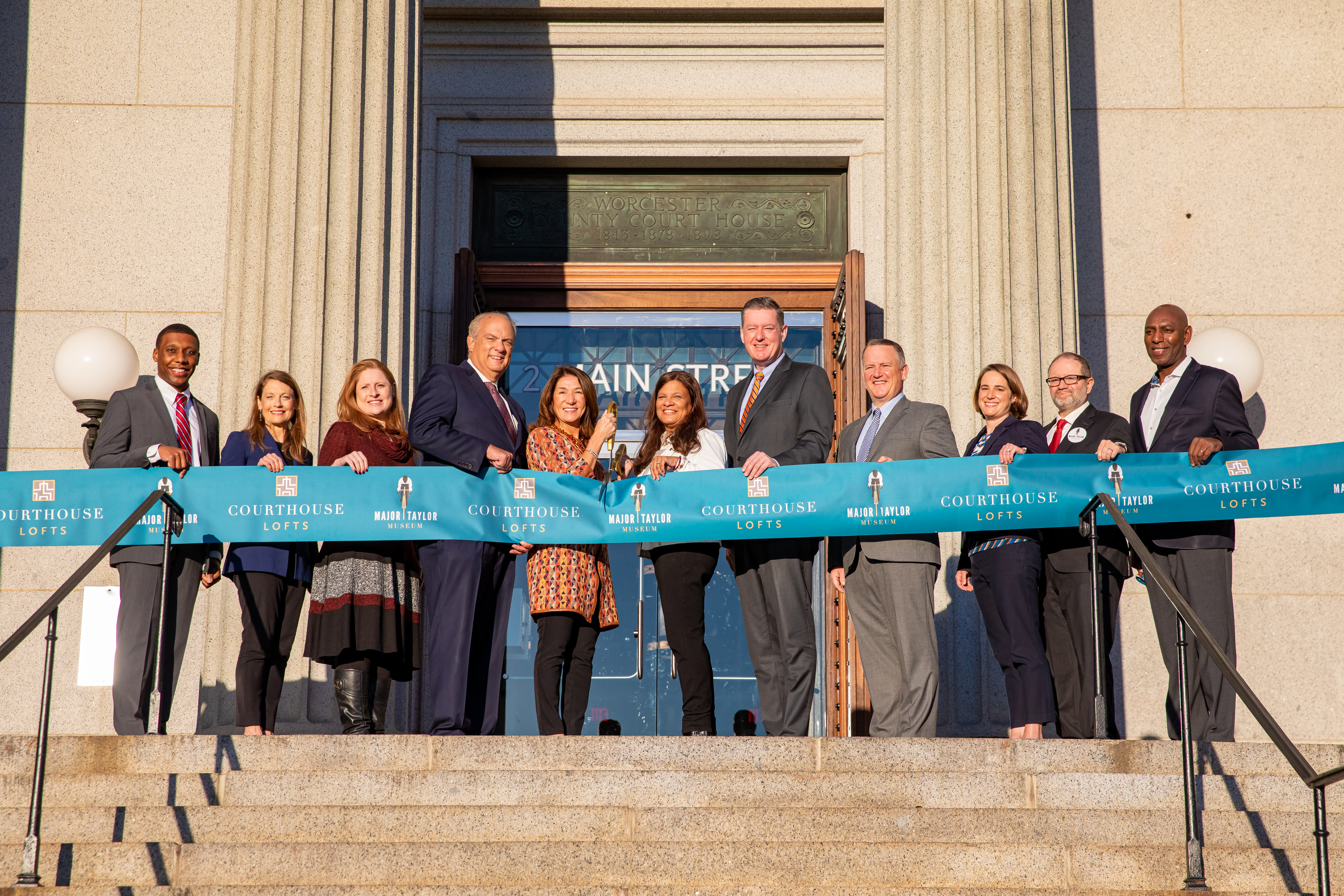
Grand opening of Courthouse Lofts (2021)

The oldest portion of the current building was constructed in 1845 to a Greek Revival design by Boston architect Ammi B. Young on a parcel of land which had been the site of a courthouse since the 1730s. As originally designed, the building had a portico of six Corinthian order columns, modeled on those of the Tower of the Winds in Athens. In 1878 an addition, designed by Worcester architect Stephen C. Earle, was added to the rear of the building. In 1897 a major project to expand the building was approved by the state legislature. After a design competition the project was awarded to Boston architects Andrews, Jaques & Rantoul. Their design more than tripled the size of the building in a style complementary to Young's building. Young's portico was demolished though its columns were preserved–a condition of the competition–and were, with two replicas, distributed across the facade.

Robert Day Andrews, senior partner of Andrews, Jaques & Rantoul, was responsible for the inscription on the Worcester courthouse: "Obedience to law is liberty." Its inclusion in the completed building was somewhat accidental: Andrews had written the phrase as a placeholder on the firm's competition drawings, and it was perpetuated in a set of drawings issued for a cost estimate. It was ultimately executed after a longer inscription by Senator George F. Hoar could not be fit on the freize. Andrews' phrase has been perpetuated elsewhere, such as on the Cuyahoga County Courthouse (1912) in Cleveland. Hoar's proposed inscription, "Here speaketh the conscience of the state restraining the individual will," was incorporated into the interior.

In 1954 a second large addition was built facing Harvard Street, for which Stuart W. Briggs and Cornelius W. Buckley were the architects. By the late 20th century, the building was seen as outmoded and too small. In 2007 a new courthouse, "the largest courthouse ever built by the state," was completed several blocks to the south. The new building was designed by Shepley Bulfinch of Boston and built by Gilbane of Providence, Rhode Island.

From 2019 to 2021, the building was extensively renovated and converted into 118 private residential housing units known as the Courthouse Lofts, and the building houses a small museum about Major Marshall Taylor, a prominent local African American bicyclist. The courthouse site also contains a statue of General Charles Devens by Daniel Chester French and Edward Clark Potter, and the courthouse site was added to the National Register of Historic Places in 2021.
