= John Whitmore (architect) =

American architect

John T. Whitmore
- Born: November 16, 1893; Springfield, Massachusetts, United States
- Died: December 14, 1943 (aged 50); Marblehead, Massachusetts, United States
- Occupation: Architect

John T. Whitmore (November 16, 1893 – December 14, 1943) was an American architect. As founding president of the Massachusetts State Association of Architects, Whitmore facilitated the passage of an architects' registration law for Massachusetts in 1941 and was inaugural chairman of the state registration board.

== Life and career ==
John Thoreau Whitmore was born November 16, 1893, in Springfield, Massachusetts, to William R. Whitmore, an artist, and Mabel Whitmore, née Turner. He was educated at Williams College and at the Massachusetts Institute of Technology. He worked for Stone & Webster before joining the firm of Andrews, Rantoul & Jones in 1920. In 1924 he became a partner in the reorganized Andrews, Jones, Biscoe & Whitmore; his partners were Robert Day Andrews, Howland Jones and Maurice B. Biscoe. He spent the rest of his career as a member of this firm. The firm's Cousens Gymnasium (1932) at Tufts University was part of the architecture event in the art competition at the 1932 Summer Olympics.

In 1938 Whitmore was elected president of the Boston Society of Architects. He served until 1941, when he was elected founding president of the Massachusetts State Association of Architects (MSAA), now AIA Massachusetts, the state-level chapter of the American Institute of Architects (AIA). As MSAA president Whitmore led the effort for a state registration law for architects. This came as Cambridge mayor John W. Lyons was being indicted for soliciting bribes from architects including John W. Beal in return for city contracts and had the support of district attorney Robert F. Bradford, prosecutor in the case. A registration law was passed in the same year and in 1942 Whitmore was appointed inaugural chairman of the Massachusetts Board of Registration of Architects. In recognition of his work he was granted license no. 1. He also served on the Salem planning board, was a president of the Massachusetts Building Congress and, from 1936 to 1938, was an architectural supervisor for the Federal Housing Authority.

== Personal life ==
Whitmore was married in 1917 to Rosamond Benson. They had three children, all sons. He died December 14, 1943, in Marblehead.
