= Nahant Civic Historic District =

Historic district in Massachusetts, United States

- U.S. National Register of Historic Places
- U.S. Historic district
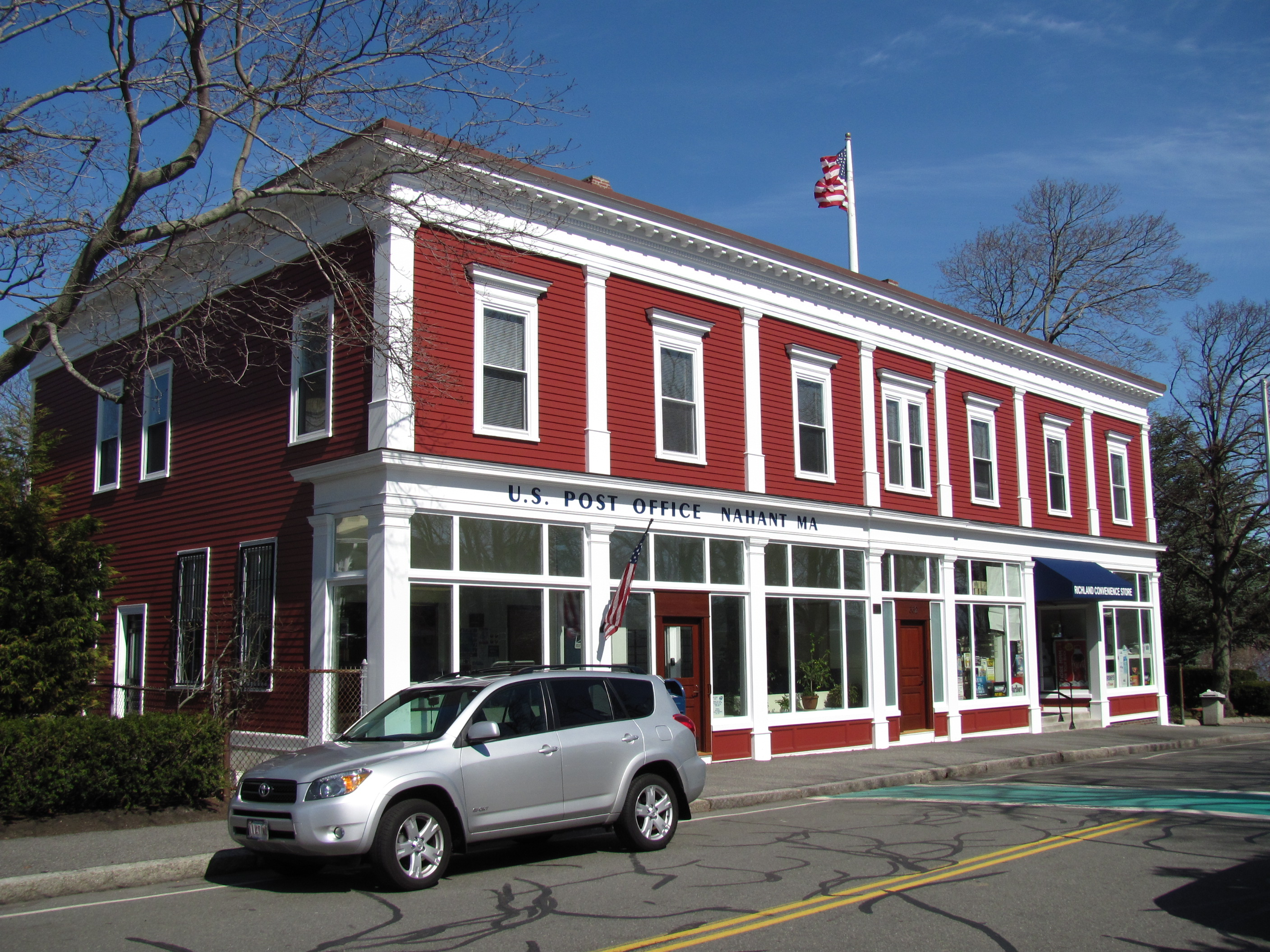
- US Post Office

- Location within Massachusetts Location within the United States
- Location: Nahant, Massachusetts
- Coordinates: 42°25′27″N 70°54′51″W
- Built: 1895
- Architect: Andrews, Jaques & Rantoul; Ball & Dabney
- Architectural style: Colonial Revival, Tudor Revival, Other
- NRHP reference No.: 91001174
- Added to NRHP: September 3, 1991

The Nahant Civic Historic District consists of three civic buildings in the center of Nahant, Massachusetts. The town hall is an H-shaped Colonial Revival structure built in 1912 to a design by the Boston firm of Andrews, Jaques & Rantoul. The library, which stands across the street, was built in 1895 in a Jacobethan (English) Revival style, its exterior made of ashlar granite with sandstone trim. Next to the town hall stands a small commercial block, a two-story Colonial Revival building built around the turn of the 20th century, whose tenants include the local post office.

The district was listed on the National Register of Historic Places in 1991.

== See also ==
- National Register of Historic Places listings in Essex County, Massachusetts
