= Fisher Hill Historic District =

Historic district in Massachusetts, United States

- U.S. National Register of Historic Places
- U.S. Historic district
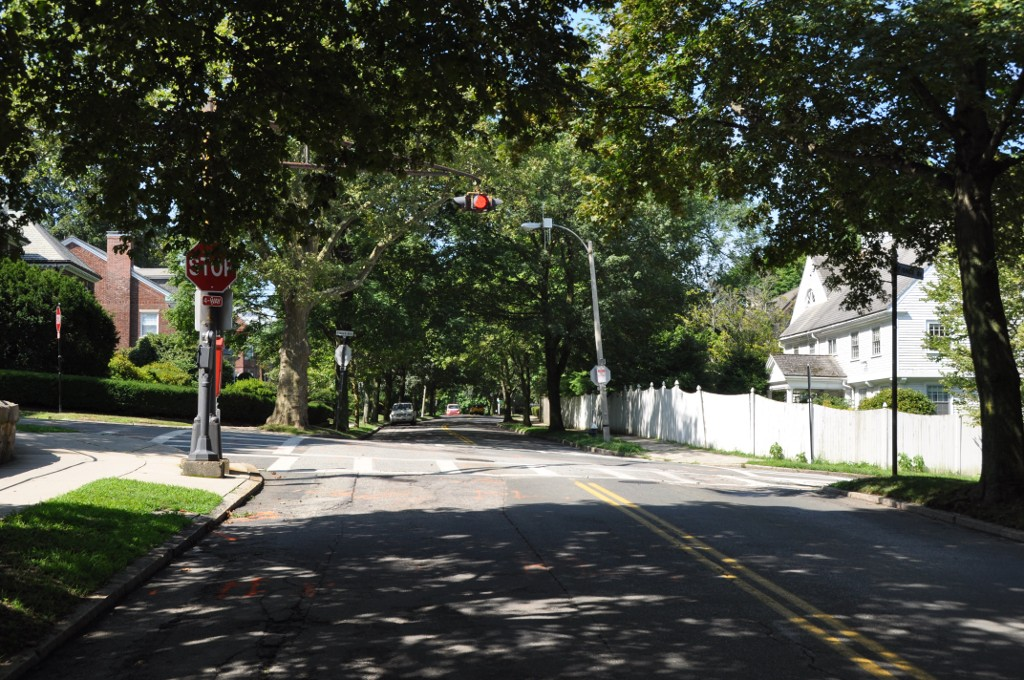
- corner of Dean and Fisher Streets

- Location within Massachusetts Location within the United States
- Location: Roughly bounded by Clinton and Sumner Rds., Boylston St. and Chestnut Hill Ave., Brookline, Massachusetts
- Coordinates: 42°19′52″N 71°8′29″W
- Area: 150 acres (61 ha)
- Architect: Frederick Law Olmsted, et al.
- Architectural style: Late 19th And 20th Century Revivals, Late Victorian
- MPS: Brookline MRA
- NRHP reference No.: 85003266
- Added to NRHP: October 17, 1985

The Fisher Hill Historic District encompasses a residential area in central Brookline, Massachusetts. The area was subdivided and built out beginning in the 1880s, with landscaping design by Frederick Law Olmsted and John Charles Olmsted. The district is bounded on the west by Chestnut Hill Avenue, Baxter Road, and Channing Road, and on the south by Massachusetts Route 9. Its eastern boundary runs along Buckminster Street to Dean Road, joining the northern boundary of Clinton Road, running between Dean Road and Chestnut Hill Avenue. Prior to its development in the 1880s, Fisher Hill had a relatively small number of landowners. Some of them banded together, hiring the Olmsteds to design a subdivision plan for the entire district. Lots were sold to wealthy individuals, who built fashionable houses, often designed by architects. In 1914 a restrictive covenant was entered into by a significant number of property owners, restricting their properties to strictly single-family residential uses.

The district was listed on the National Register of Historic Places in 1985.

== See also ==
- National Register of Historic Places listings in Brookline, Massachusetts
