= Smyth Public Library =

- U.S. National Register of Historic Places
- NH State Register of Historic Places
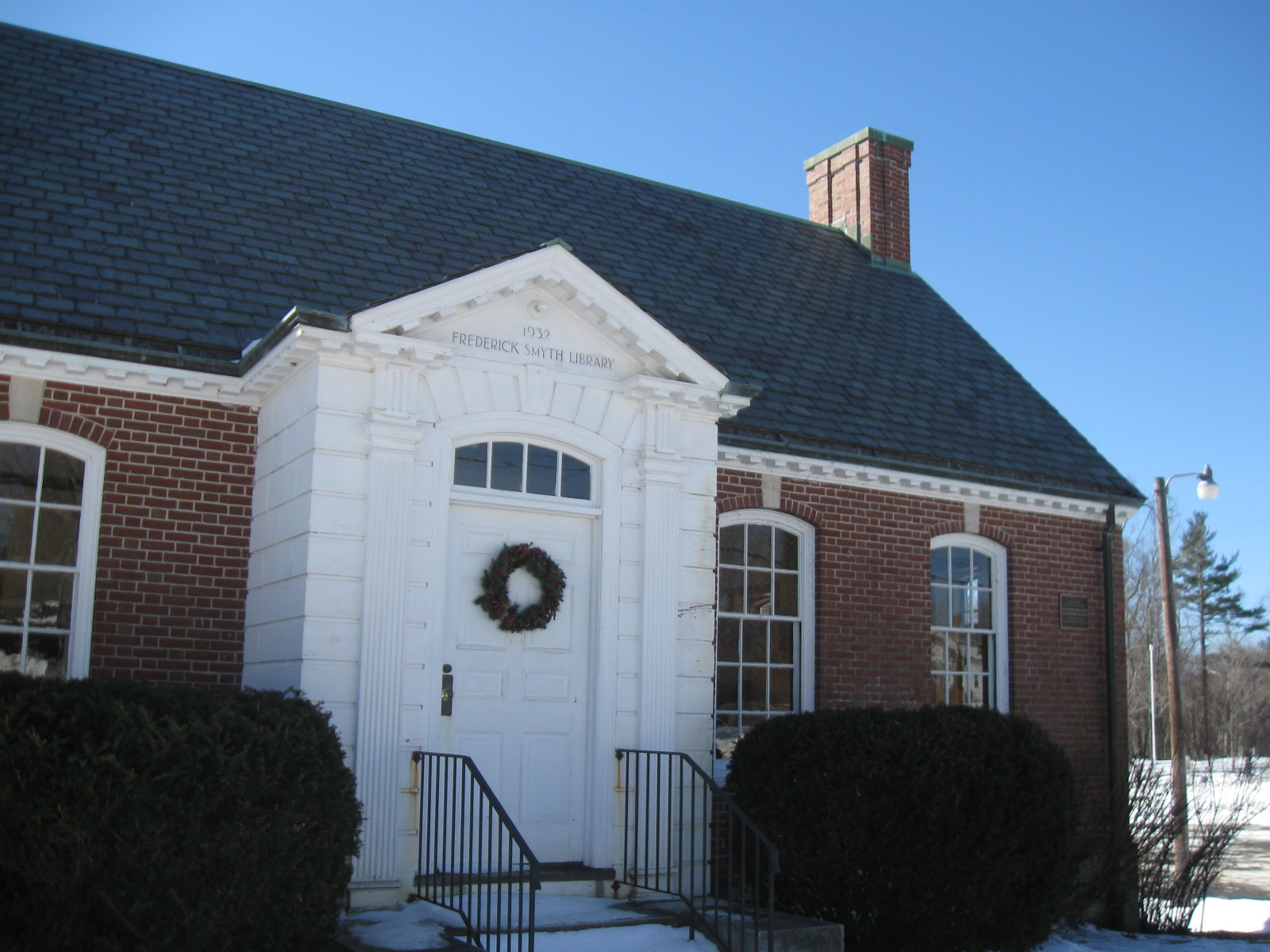
- 1932 building

- Location within New Hampshire Location within the United States
- Location: 194 High St., Candia, New Hampshire
- Coordinates: 43°3′47″N 71°18′10″W
- Area: less than one acre
- Built: 1932
- Architect: Andrews, Jones, Biscoe & Whitmore; Shattuck, L.H. Inc.
- Architectural style: Colonial Revival
- NRHP reference No.: 07000948

Significant dates
- Added to NRHP: September 13, 2007
- Designated NHSRHP: April 30, 2007

Smyth Public Library refers to several buildings that have served as the public library of Candia, New Hampshire, United States. The current building, which opened in 2002, is located at 55 High Street. The previous library building at 194 High Street was constructed in 1932 and was listed on the National Register of Historic Places in September 2007, and the New Hampshire State Register of Historic Places in April 2007.

Early library history in Candia dates back to 1824 with the formation of the Candia Library Literary Society. Over the course of many years it changed its name, but there was always a lending library of some description.

== History ==
In the middle of the nineteenth century, Frederick Smyth was a Candia native who had left his hometown and become successful in business and politics. He made a considerable fortune in banking and railroads, and was governor of New Hampshire from 1852 to 1854 and again in 1864.

In 1888 the private library system in Candia was in severe straits. Local residents called upon then ex-Governor Smyth for help. He pledged $1,000 to open up a library for public use. The first meeting of the Smyth Public Library Association was in May 1888, and Candia had its first library. Fundraising began to buy books, and the library had 740 titles when it first opened. The building it occupied then is known as the Fitts Museum today.

Due to the generous nature of Governor Smyth and his wife Marion, a sum of money was donated to the Library Association to build a new library. The resulting brick building on the hill at 194 High Street opened in 1932; it was added to the National Register of Historic Places in 2007.

== New building ==
Candia's new 6,200-square-foot (580 m^{2}) Smyth Public Library opened in December 2002. It is situated between the Candia Elementary School, the Candia Park, and the new (2004-5) Candia Town Pond & Natural Area; it is linked to all three via a new sidewalk and trail system. Among the library's features is a working fireplace in the leisure reading area, an art display gallery, and an outdoor reading garden with extensive perennial flower plantings and comfortable benches overlooking the pond.

The mission of Smyth Public Library is to provide and ensure access to books, information, materials, and services that fulfill the educational, informational, cultural, recreational, and professional needs of Candia's residents in a welcoming, respectful, and supportive environment.

== See also ==
- National Register of Historic Places listings in Rockingham County, New Hampshire
