= Shady Hill Historic District =

Historic district in Massachusetts, United States

- U.S. National Register of Historic Places
- U.S. Historic district
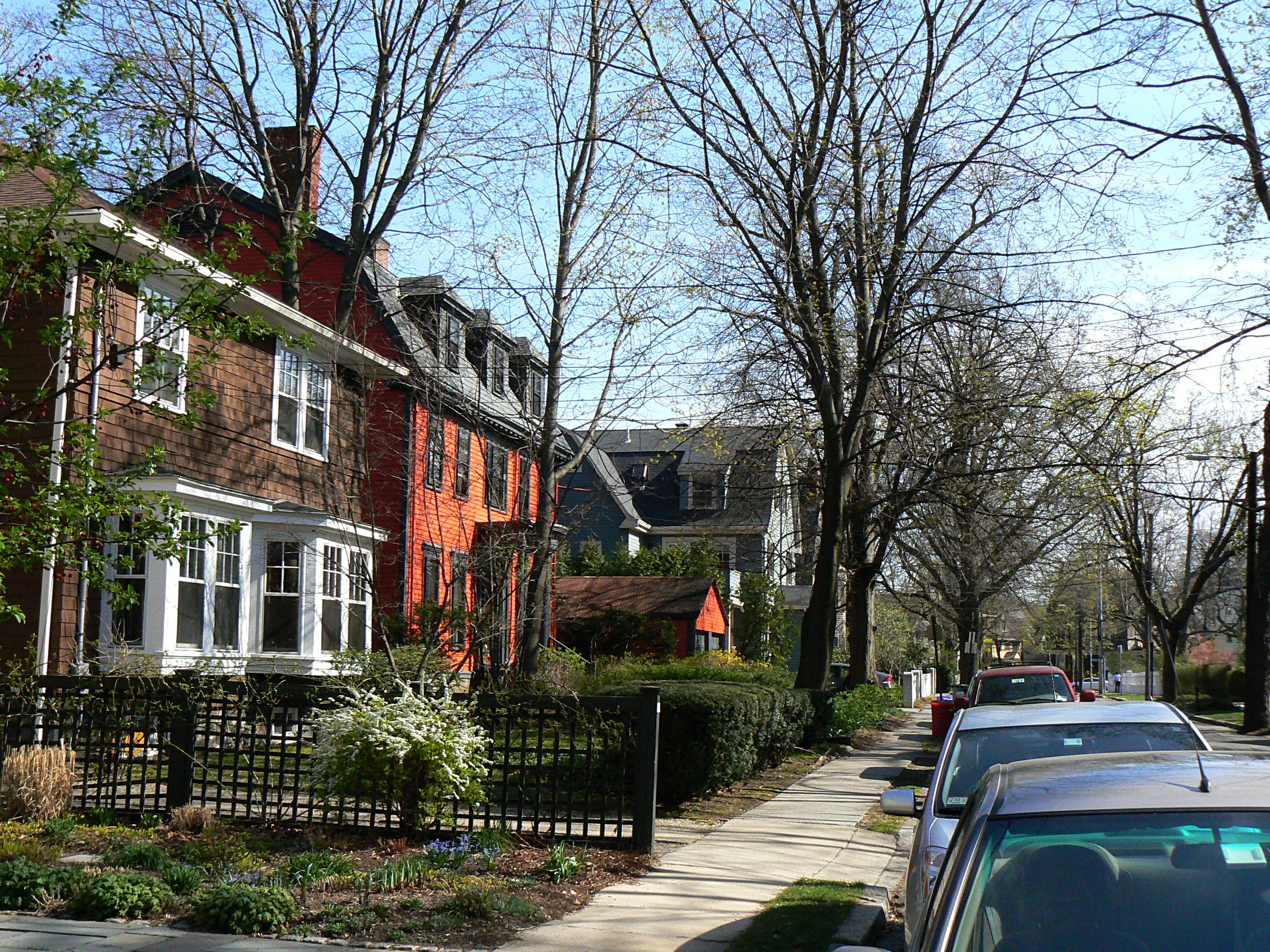
- Francis Avenue

- Location within Massachusetts Location within the United States
- Location: Cambridge, Massachusetts
- Coordinates: 42°22′45″N 71°6′41″W
- Area: 26.5 acres (10.7 ha)
- Architect: Francis, Ebenezer; et al.
- Architectural style: Mid 19th Century Revival, Late 19th And 20th Century Revivals, Late Victorian
- MPS: Cambridge MRA
- NRHP reference No.: 86001680
- Added to NRHP: May 19, 1986

The Shady Hill Historic District is a historic district roughly bounded by Museum, Beacon and Holden, and Kirkland Streets, and Francis Avenue in Cambridge, Massachusetts. The district encompasses a residential area that is one of the city's most homogeneous neighborhoods of the second half of the 19th century. Located just east of the Harvard University campus, the area is characterized by large lot sizes and winding roads, with mature trees providing shade. The houses in the district are predominantly Queen Anne and Colonial Revival in character.

The district was added to the National Register of Historic Places in 1986.

== See also ==
- National Register of Historic Places listings in Cambridge, Massachusetts
