= Palmer Hall (Colorado Springs, Colorado) =

- U.S. National Register of Historic Places
- Colorado State Register of Historic Properties
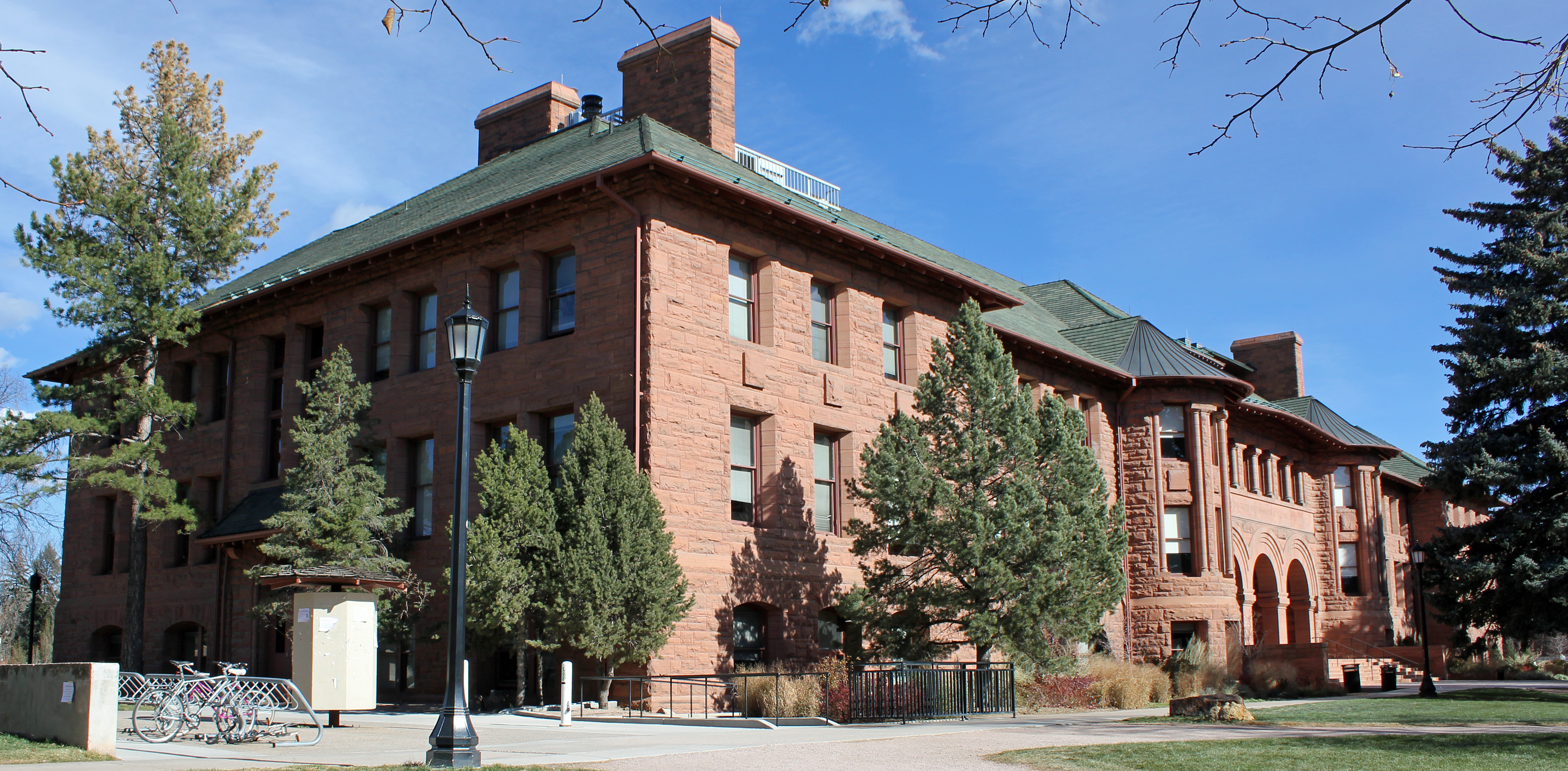
- Location: 116 E. San Rafael, Colorado Springs, Colorado
- Coordinates: 38°50′56″N 104°49′19″W
- Built: 1904
- NRHP reference No.: 86001412
- Added to NRHP: July 3, 1986

The Palmer Hall is a historic building located on 116 E. San Rafael in Colorado Springs, Colorado. It was added to the National Register of Historic Places on July 3, 1986. It is part of the Colorado College campus. Built in 1904, it was named after William Jackson Palmer.
