= Oneida Football Club Monument =

Monument in Boston, Massachusetts, U.S.

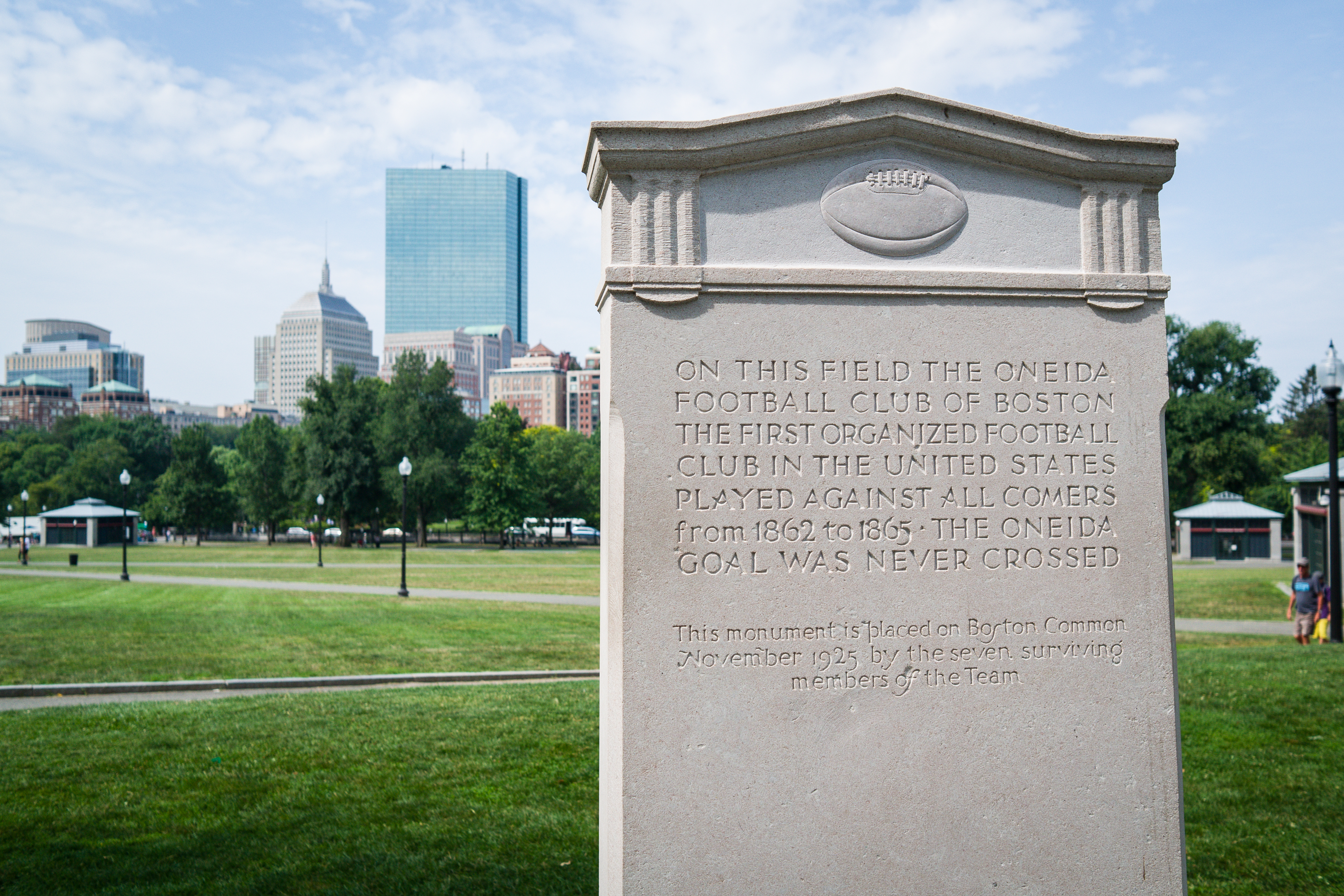
- The monument photographed in 2017
- Interactive map of Oneida Football Club Monument
- Location: Boston, Massachusetts, U.S.
- Coordinates: 42°21′22.5″N 71°4′1.8″W
- Designer: Robert Day Andrews, Joseph Coletti and Howland Jones
- Type: Monument
- Material: Marble
- Length: 2.5 ft
- Width: 7 in
- Height: 6.5 ft
- Opening date: November 1925; 101 years ago
- Dedicated to: Oneida Football Club

The Oneida Football Club Monument, sometimes called Football Tablet, is a monument made by Joseph Coletti; which was installed on the Boston Common, in Boston, Massachusetts, United States.

It was built as a remembrance to the Oneida Football Club, the first organized team to play any kind of football in the United States. The game played by the club, known as the "Boston game", was an informal local variant that predated the codification of rules for association football, rugby football, or American football. The team, made up of students of Boston's elite preparatory schools, played on Boston Common from 1862 to 1865, during which time they reportedly never lost a game or even gave up a single point.

== Description and history ==
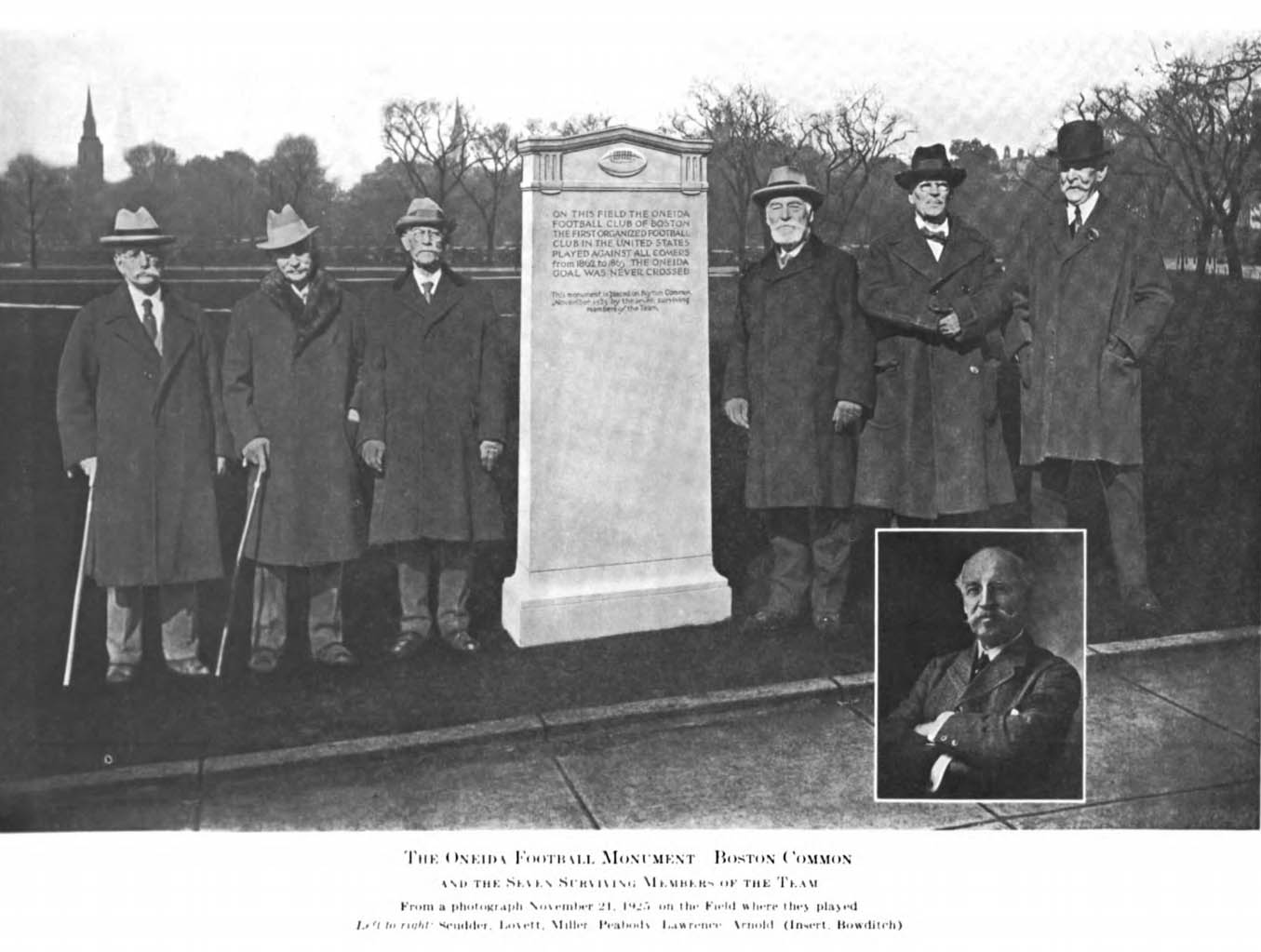
The six surviving members of the Oneida Football Club at the monument's inauguration; from left to right: Winthrop Scudder, James Lovett, Gerritt Miller, Francis Peabody, Robert Lawrence, Edward Arnold. Insert: Edward Bowditch

The marble tablet was donated by seven members of the Oneida Football Club and installed in 1925. It measures approximately 6.5 ft. × 2.5 ft. × 7 in.

An inscription on the front reads:

ON THIS FIELD THE ONEIDA
FOOTBALL CLUB OF BOSTON
THE FIRST ORGANIZED FOOTBALL
CLUB IN THE UNITED STATES
PLAYED AGAINST ALL COMERS
from 1862 to 1865. THE ONEIDA
GOAL WAS NEVER CROSSED

This monument is placed on Boston Common
November 1925 by the seven surviving members of the Team"

An inscription on the back can also be found which reads, "MEMBERS OF THE ONEIDA TEAM", under this was the list of the 16 members of the original team.

The monument was unveiled on Saturday November 21, 1925, and was attended by the six surviving members of the team including its founder and captain Gerritt Smith Miller. It was designed by architects Robert Day Andrews and Howland Jones of the Boston architecture firm Andrews, Jones, Biscoe & Whitmore and executed by sculptor Joseph Coletti.

It was surveyed by the Smithsonian Institution's "Save Outdoor Sculpture!" program in 1997.

== Change from football to soccer ball ==
The initial purpose of the monument was to commemorate the role of the Oneida team in the creation of American football. Accordingly, the sculpture depicted a football, although the "Boston game" was actually played with a round ball (one of the Oneida balls still survives and is held by Historic New England). In the 1980s, the American soccer community paid for the monument to be renewed with a depiction of a soccer ball, which more closely matched the real ball of the "Boston game". In 2014, the football was restored to the monument, inaccurate to the actual game of 1863-5 but more accurate to the original erection of the tablet in 1925.

== See also ==
- 1925 in art
- History of soccer in the United States
