= 1866 Carroll Pioneers men's soccer team =

American college soccer season

1866 Carroll Pioneers men's soccer

National Champions (ASHA)
- Conference: Independent
- Record: 1–1–0
- Head coach: Unknown

1866–67 college soccer records
| | Conf. | | | Overall |
| Team | W | L | T | W | | L | | T |
|---|---|---|---|---|---|---|---|---|
| Carroll (WI) | | – | | 1 | – | 1 | – | 0 |
| Trinity (CT) | | – | | 0 | – | 0 | – | 2 |
| Fordham | | – | | 0 | – | 0 | – | 1 |
| Fordham | | – | | 0 | – | 0 | – | 1 |
| Woodward | | – | | 0 | – | 0 | – | 0 |

The 1866–67 Carroll Pioneers men's soccer team represented Carroll University during the 1866–67 college soccer season. The program was retroactively declared national champions by the American Soccer History Archives. This was by the virtue of being the only known college with known results during this time.

During this time, the club played two games, both times against the Waukesha town club. Carroll won the first match, which was played on the County Fairgrounds, while Waukesha won the second.

By some records, each of the days the matches were played were individual games, where the first team to score a goal won the game. By this metric, the team had a record of 8–7–0, although most record keeping sites declare the team having one win and one loss.

== Schedule ==
| Date Time, TV | Rank^{#} | Opponent^{#} | Result | Record | Site City, State |
Regular season
| 10-11-1866* | | vs. Waukesha | W 5–2 | 1–0–0 | County Fairgrounds; Waukesha, WI |
| 10-18-1866* | | vs. Waukesha | L 3–5 | 1–1–0 | County Fairgrounds; Waukesha, WI |
*Non-conference game. ^{#}Rankings from United Soccer Coaches. (#) Tournament seedings in parentheses.

== See also ==
- 1860s in American soccer
