= 1866–67 college soccer season =

Game History

The 1866–67 college soccer season is the first record year of association football-like games being held that involved universities in the United States. It is considered the first formal season of college soccer in the United States due it being the first year that the sport was played with the 1863 London codes. There were three known games this year that involved American colleges. This included Wisconsin's Carroll College, who played two exhibitions against the Waukesha Town Team in Waukesha, Wisconsin. The Waukesha team and Carroll College exchanged a win and loss. Additionally, Connecticut's Trinity College had an intra-university scrimmage between its class of 1869 and its class of 1870. The match ended in a draw. No intercollegiate games between two universities are recorded to have taken place.

== Standings ==
1866–67 college soccer records
	Conf.			Overall
Team	W	L	T	W		L		T
Carroll		–		1	–	1	–	0
Trinity (CT)		–		0	–	0	–	1

== See also ==
- 1860s in American soccer
