= Intercollegiate Football Association =

- Successor: Ivy League
- Formation: 1873
- Founder: Princeton; Yale; Rutgers
- Dissolved: 1893; 133 years ago
- Type: Sports governing body
- Location: United States
- Region served: United States

The Intercollegiate Football Association (IFA), also known as the American Intercollegiate Football Association, was one of the earliest college football rules-making and scheduling organizations in existence; it was active from the 1873 to 1893 seasons. The IFA teams, Columbia, Harvard, Princeton, and Yale, are now members of the Ivy League.

== From soccer to rugby ==
The 1869 game between Princeton and Rutgers, which has been called the first intercollegiate football game in America, was a version of association football, known in North America as 'soccer'. The rules were based on those first created by The Football Association in London, England. The first IFA was founded in 1873 by Princeton, Yale, and Rutgers to adopt common rules to replace the practice of playing under the home team's rules. Harvard refused to attend the founding meeting, preferring to keep the Boston game, a cross between association and rugby football.

== Massasoit House conventions ==
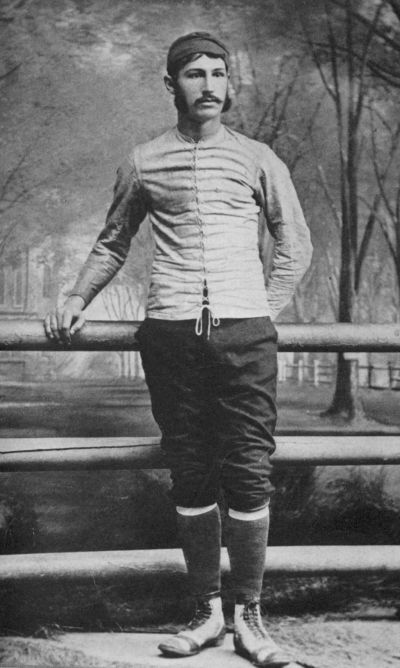
Walter Camp, pictured here in 1878 as the captain of the Yale University football team

On November 23, 1876, representatives from Harvard, Yale, Princeton, and Columbia met at the Massasoit House hotel in Springfield, Massachusetts, to standardize a new code of rules based on the rugby game first introduced to Harvard by McGill University in 1874. The rules were based largely on the Rugby Football Union's code from England, though one important difference was the replacement of a kicked goal with a touchdown as the primary means of scoring (a change that would later occur in rugby itself, favoring the try as the main scoring event). Three of the schools—Harvard, Columbia, and Princeton—formed the second Intercollegiate Football Association as a result of the meeting. Yale did not join the group until 1879, because of an early disagreement about the number of players per team. This was the first comprehensive effort to organize and standardize American football. This IFA lasted from the 1877 season until 1893.

Walter Camp, the "father of American football", was instrumental in creating the rules of American football. Camp became a fixture at the annual Massasoit House conventions where rules were debated and changed. He proposed a rule change at the first meeting he attended in 1878: a reduction from fifteen players to eleven. The motion was rejected at that time but passed in 1880. The effect was to open up the game and emphasize speed over strength. Camp's most famous change, the establishment of the line of scrimmage and the snap from center to quarterback, was also passed in 1880. At the 1882 rules meeting, Camp proposed that a team be required to advance the ball a minimum of five yards within three downs.

== See also ==
- Early history of American football
