= Wollaston Fire Station =

- U.S. National Register of Historic Places
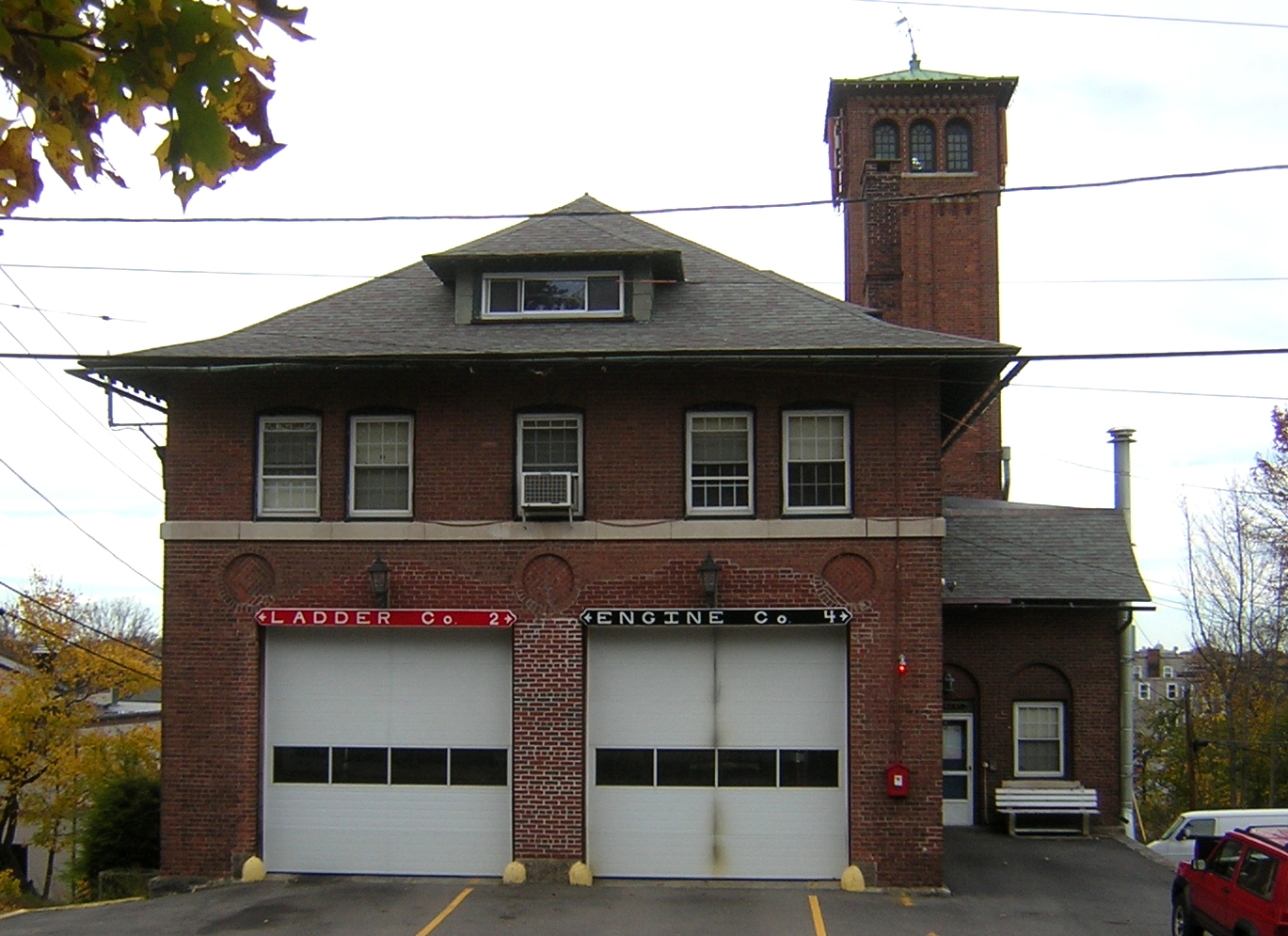

- Location within Massachusetts Location within the United States
- Location: 111 Beale St., Quincy, Massachusetts
- Coordinates: 42°15′54.9″N 71°1′13.1″W
- Area: 0.4 acres (0.16 ha)
- Built: 1901
- Architect: Jones & Hart
- Architectural style: Italianate
- MPS: Quincy MRA
- NRHP reference No.: 89001317
- Added to NRHP: September 20, 1989

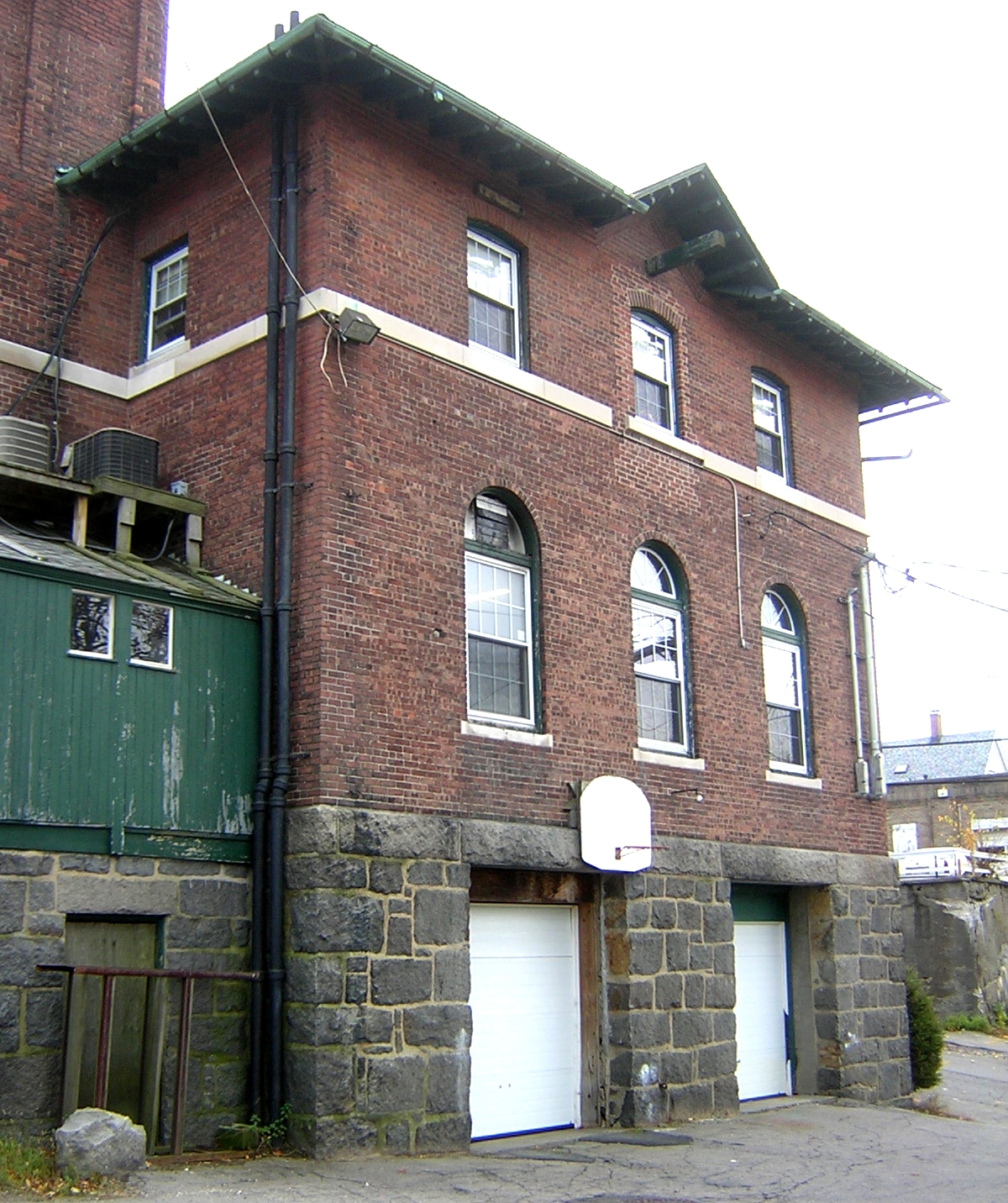

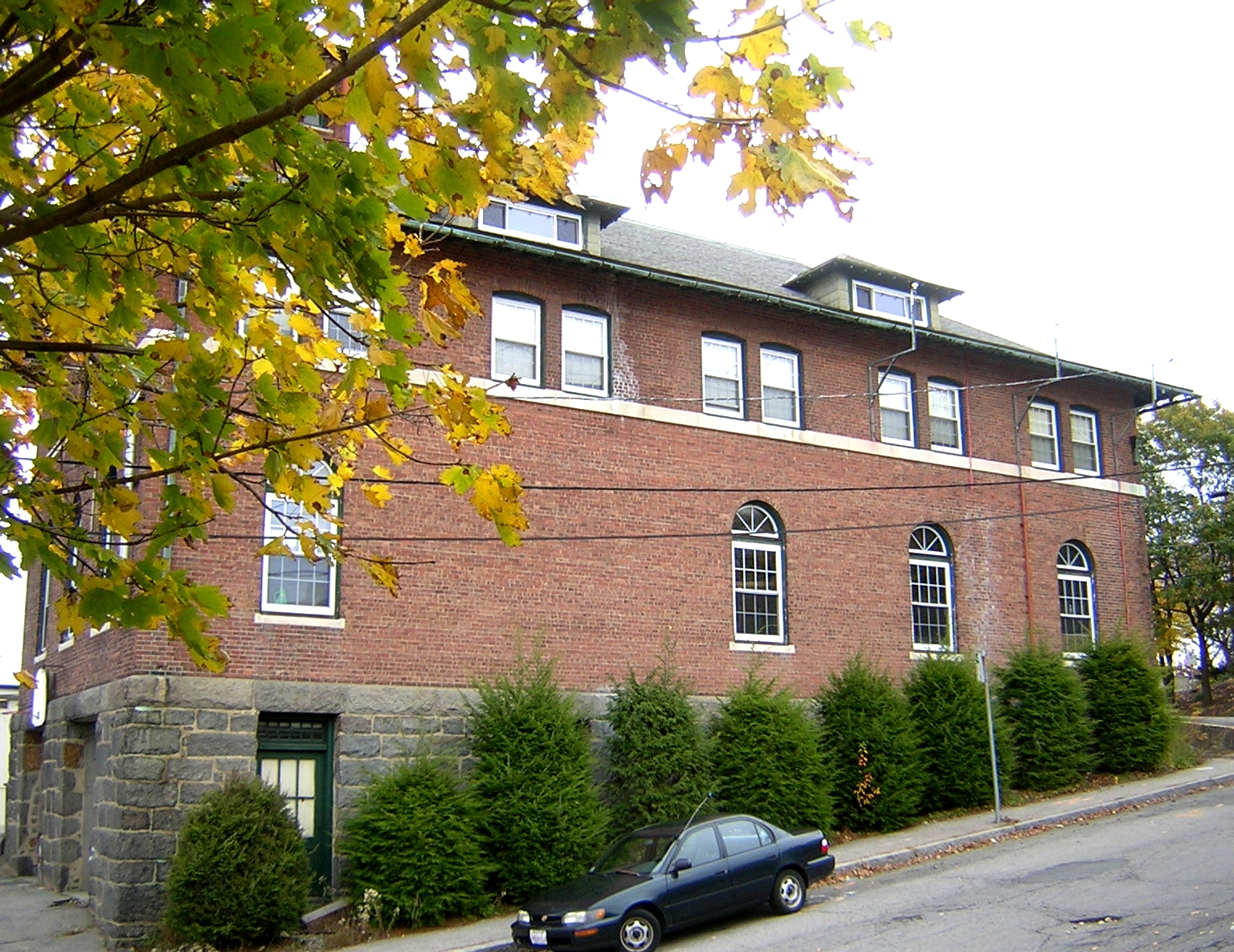

Wollaston Fire Station is a historic fire station at 111 Beale Street in Quincy, Massachusetts. The two-story brick building was completed in 1901 on the site of an earlier wooden fire station, and is a fine local example of Italianate design. It was designed by Boston architects Jones & Hart, one of the partners of which, Howland Jones, had grown up in Wollaston. The tower, which dominates the structure, has a low-pitch tile roof over a corbelled eave, and an arched arcade. Its original arched bay entries have lost their original arched openings in order to accommodate large pieces of equipment.

The building was listed on the National Register of Historic Places in 1989.

== See also ==
- National Register of Historic Places listings in Quincy, Massachusetts
