= Joseph Coletti =

American sculptor (1898–1973)

Joseph A. Coletti
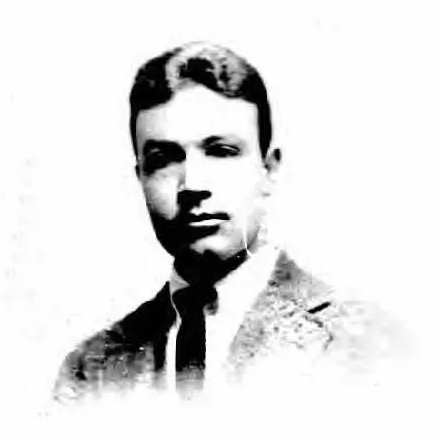
- Coletti's passport picture (1923)
- Born: November 5, 1894; San Donato, Italy
- Died: May 5, 1973 (aged 78); Boston, Massachusetts, U.S.
- Education: Harvard University
- Occupation: Sculptor
- Spouse: Mirian Kerruish Whitney
- Children: 2 daughters

Joseph Arthur Coletti (November 5, 1898 – May 5, 1973) was an Italian-born American sculptor.

== Life ==
Coletti was born in San Donato, Italy, on November 5, 1898. He was brought to the United States by his parents when he was two years old, and he was educated in public school in Quincy, Massachusetts. He then studied at the Massachusetts Art School before attending Harvard University from which he graduated in 1923. The University awarded him a fellowship to travel and study in Europe and this was followed by two years study at the American Academy in Rome. Returning to America he studied with and assisted John Singer Sargent in his work on the Boston Public Library ceilings.

This work led Coletti into the field of architectural sculpture where much of his life’s work was done. He was also an accomplished medalist, creating works for Harvard University. In 1963 he created the 68th issue of the Society of Medalists, Glory of God/Great Frigate Bird. He also produced numerous public portrait statues.

Coletti was a member of the National Sculpture Society and contributed several articles on sculpture for the Encyclopedia Britannica.

Coletti married Miriam Kerruish Whitney in 1929, and he had two daughters. He resided in Back Bay, Boston, where he died on May 5, 1973.

== Work ==
- Oneida Football Club Monument, Boston Common, in Boston, Massachusetts, 1925
- Thomas Crane Public Library, stone carvings, Quincy, Massachusetts, 1939
- Mourning Victory, Salem, Massachusetts, 1947
- Statue of David I. Walsh, Charles River Esplanade, Boston, 1954
- extensive sculptural program for Cathedral of Mary Our Queen, Baltimore, Maryland 1955-1956
- Statue of Edward Lawrence Logan, Logan International Airport, Boston, 1956
- Statue of Saint Teresa of Avila, National Cathedral, Washington D.C., 1964
- Medal of the Dante Society of America, 1965
