= Thomas Crane Public Library =

- U.S. National Register of Historic Places
- U.S. National Historic Landmark
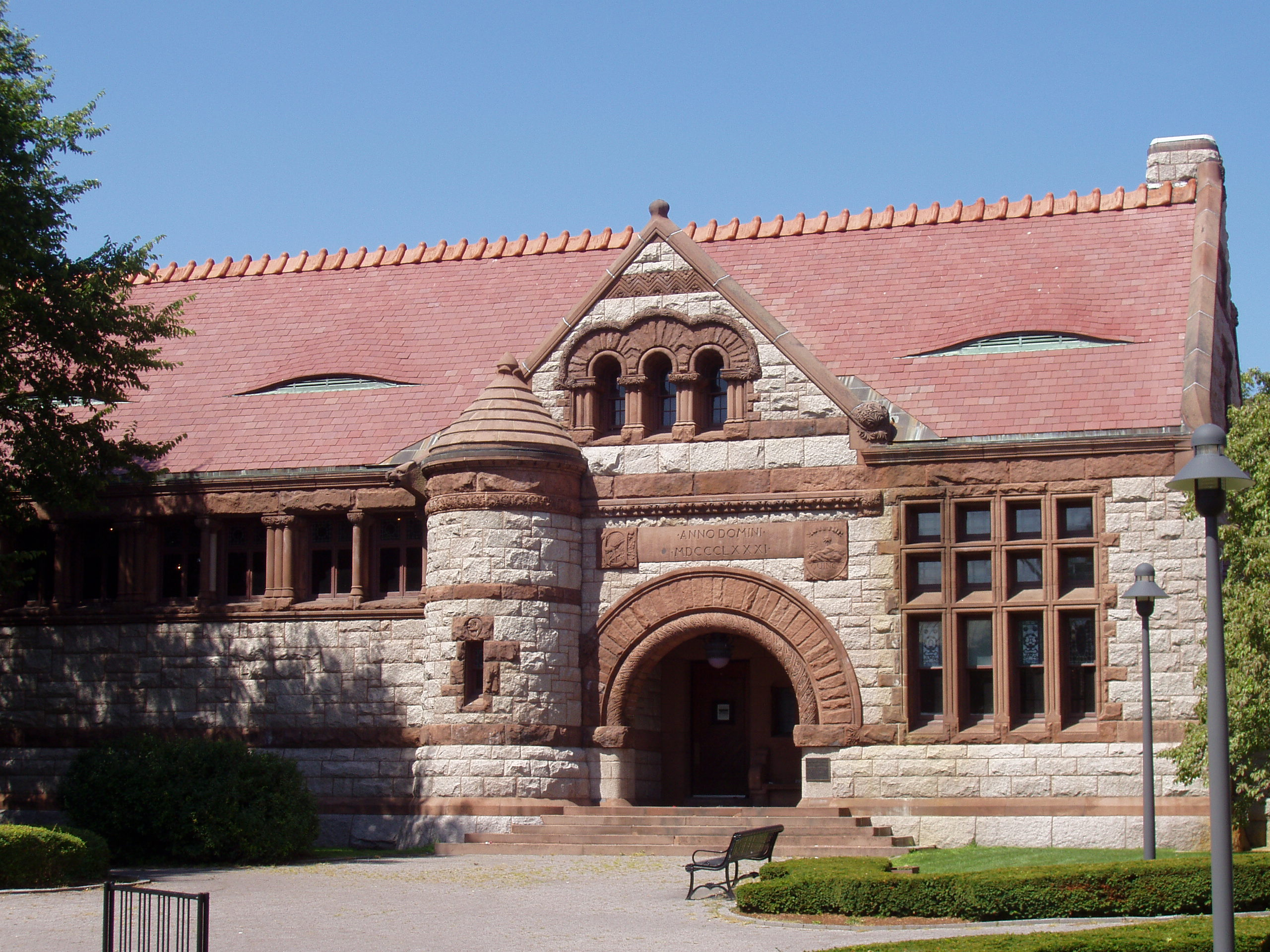
- The original building (1882), front view, architect H. H. Richardson

- Location within Massachusetts Location within the United States
- Location: Quincy, Massachusetts
- Coordinates: 42°15′6″N 71°0′4″W
- Built: 1881
- Architect: Henry Hobson Richardson
- Architectural style: Richardsonian Romanesque
- NRHP reference No.: 72000143

Significant dates
- Added to NRHP: October 18, 1972
- Designated NHL: December 23, 1987

- Wollaston Branch, Thomas Crane Public Library
- U.S. National Register of Historic Places
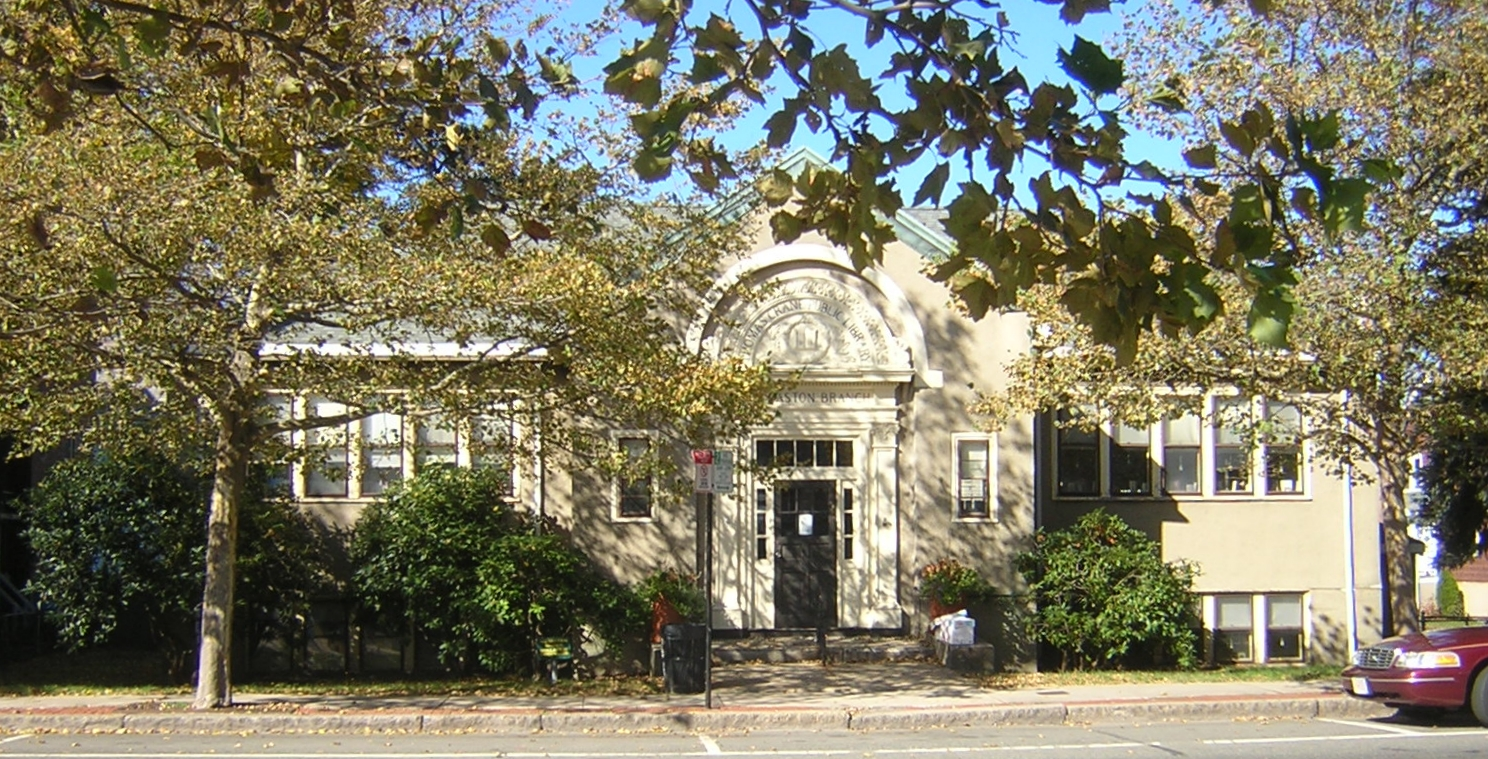
- The Wollaston Branch
- Location: 41 Beale St., Quincy, Massachusetts
- Coordinates: 42°16′0.44″N 71°1′4.48″W
- Area: 0.2 acres (0.081 ha)
- Built: 1922
- Architect: William Chapman
- Architectural style: Classical Revival
- MPS: Quincy MRA
- NRHP reference No.: 89001316
- Added to NRHP: September 20, 1989

The Thomas Crane Public Library (TCPL) is a city library in Quincy, Massachusetts. Noted for its Richardsonian Romanesque architecture, the building was funded by the Crane family as a memorial to Thomas Crane, a wealthy stone contractor who got his start in the Quincy quarries. The Thomas Crane Library has the second largest municipal collection in Massachusetts after the Boston Public Library.

== Architecture ==
The Thomas Crane Public Library was built in four stages: the original building (1882) by architect Henry Hobson Richardson; an additional ell with stack space and stained glass (1908) by William Martin Aiken in Richardson's style; a major expansion (1939) by architects Paul A. and Carroll Coletti, with stone carvings by sculptor Joseph Coletti of Quincy; and a recent addition (2001) by Boston architects Childs, Bertman, and Tseckares, which doubled the size of the library. H. H. Richardson considered this library among his most successful civic buildings, and Harper's Weekly called it "the best village library in the United States". The library was ranked 43rd in a national poll conducted in 2007 by the American Institute of Architects of the favorite buildings in the nation.

=== Richardson Building (1882) ===
The original construction of the Library, now referred to colloquially as the Richardson Building, was formally designated as Crane Memorial Hall, home to the Thomas Crane Public Library when it celebrated its opening on May 30, 1882. The building is host to a 30 × 10 inch stained-glass window by noted American artist John LaFarge in memory of Thomas Crane, Old Philosopher. It is flanked by two additional intricate 30 x 10 inch windows, Alpha and Omega. To the left of the elaborately carved fireplace is another LaFarge window, "Angel at the Tomb", made in memory of Crane's son Benjamin Franklin Crane (1841 - 1889) after his untimely passing. It was commissioned by his mother Clarissa Starkey Crane and brother Albert Crane. The library's grounds were designed by renowned landscape architect Frederick Law Olmsted, and renovated by the Olmsted Brothers between 1907 and 1911.

The Thomas Crane Public Library was designated a National Historic Landmark in 1987, recognizing it as one of Richardson's finest library buildings.

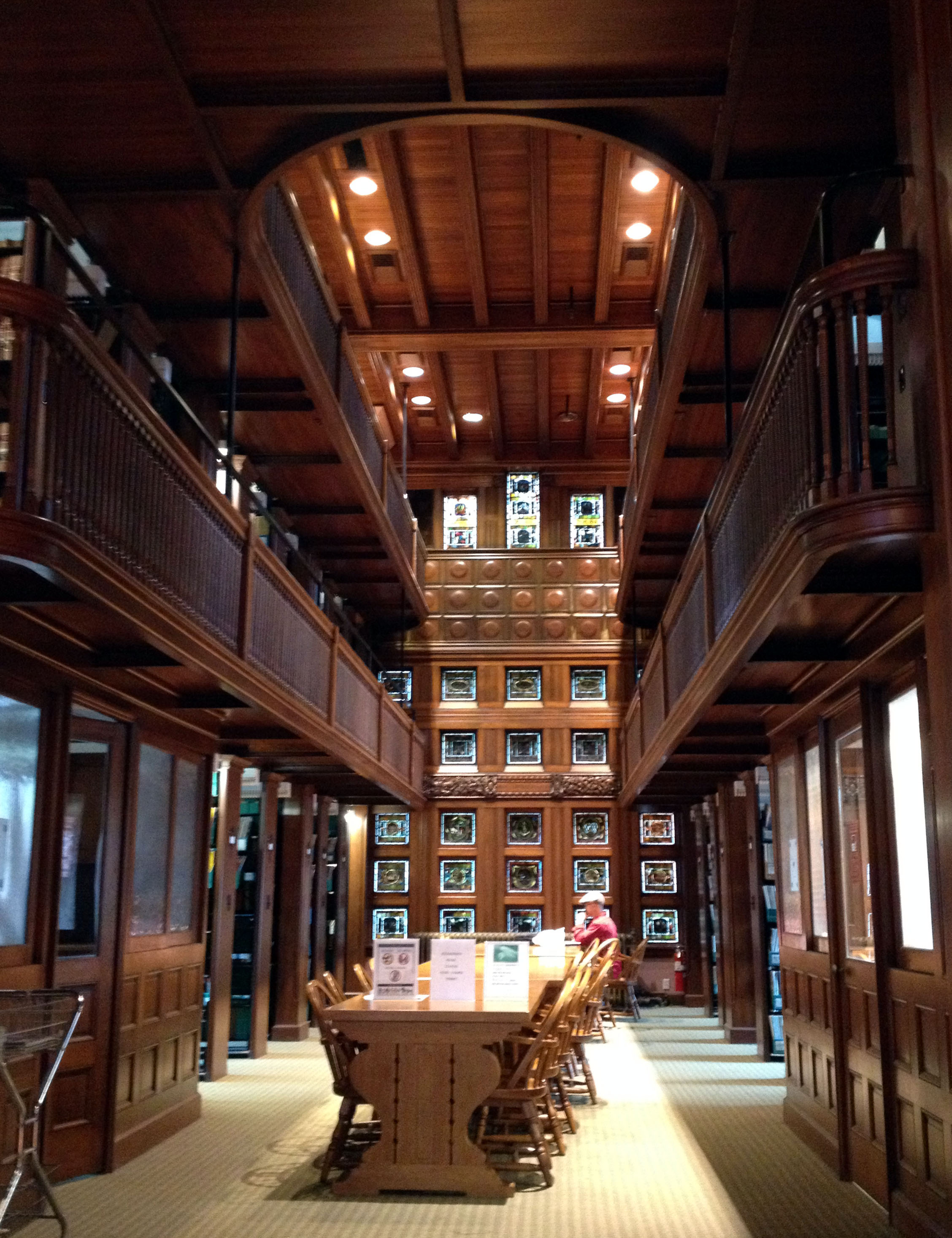
Aiken Ell Interior

== Branches ==
By 1910 there were two "reading rooms," one in the Atlantic neighborhood on Atlantic Street and one in West Quincy. By the 1920s the system had expanded to nine branches in all, adding ones near the Parker Elementary School and the Furnace Brook Parkway, and ones in the Squantum, South Quincy, Wollaston and Quincy Point neighborhoods. Municipal budget cutbacks in 1981 slashed the number to just three besides the main building: the Wollaston branch (1922), which is listed separately on the National Register of Historic Places, the North Quincy branch (1963) on Hancock Street near North Quincy High School, and the Adams Shore branch (1970) on Sea Street in Hough's Neck.

== Community ==
The library often hosts concerts, lectures and art exhibitions. There are also private rooms available for use free of charge to the public or to small community organizations. Also, the library hosts Quincy's local public-access television cable TV channel, QATV.

== See also ==
- List of National Historic Landmarks in Massachusetts
- National Register of Historic Places listings in Quincy, Massachusetts
