= 1860s in American soccer =

The 1860s were widely considered the first decade where organized forms of association football codes were played in the United States, although it is uncertain whether or not it was variants of modern-day rugby football, American football, or association football. The first reported types of organized ball kicking originated during the American Civil War, and following the Civil War the first official match reports for association football were reported.

== Pre-1865 ==
=== Oneida Football Club ===
The Oneida Football Club was established in 1862 by Gerrit Smith "Gat" Miller, a graduate of the Latin School of Epes Sargent Dixwell, a private college preparatory school in Boston. At the time there were no formal rules for football games, with different schools and areas playing their own variations. This informal style of play was often chaotic and very violent, and Miller had been a star of the game while attending Dixwell. However, he grew tired of these disorganized games, and organized other recent preparatory school graduates to join what would be the first organized football team in the United States.

The team consisted of a group of Boston secondary school students from relatively elite public (state) schools in the area, such as Boston Latin School and the English High School of Boston. Organization served the club well, and it reportedly never lost a game, or even allowed a single goal.

== 1866 ==
=== International matches ===
No international matches were played during the 1866 calendar year.

=== Club matches ===
The following are known American soccer club matches that were played in 1866.

October 11, 1866	Carroll College	5–2	Waukesha Town Club	Waukesha, Wisconsin
		Report		Stadium: Carroll College

October 18, 1866	Carroll College	3–5	Waukesha Town Team	Waukesha, Wisconsin
		Report		Stadium: Waukesha County Fairgrounds

October 20, 1866	Trinity College Class of 1869	1–1	Trinity College Class of 1870	Hartford, Connecticut
		Report		Stadium: Washington & Baker Streets Grounds

Another match between Waukesha Town Club and Carroll College was played on October 23, 1866, but the score of the match is unknown.

== 1867 ==
=== International matches ===
No international matches were played during the 1867 calendar year.

=== Club matches ===
No club matches were reported during the 1867 calendar year.

== 1868 ==
=== International matches ===
No international matches were played during the 1868 calendar year.

=== Club matches ===
The following are known American soccer club matches that were played in 1868. The only reported soccer fixtures in the United States occurred in the Salt Lake City and New Orleans metropolitan areas.

February 22, 1868	Salt Lake City Team A	Unknown	Salt Lake City Team B	Hot Spring Lake, Utah
		Report		Stadium: Hot Spring Lake Field

June 10, 1868	West Jordan Lower Branch	Unknown	West Jordan Middle Branch	West Jordan, Utah
		Report		Stadium: Utah Field

July 12, 1868	New Orleans St. Joseph's Association	postponed	Challenge Team	New Orleans, Louisiana
		Report		Stadium: Oakland Riding Park
Note: Match was not played and postponed.

July 19, 1868	New Orleans St. Joseph's Association	Unknown	Challenge Team	New Orleans, Louisiana
		Report		Stadium: Oakland Riding Park

July 21, 1868	New Orleans St. Joseph's Association	Unknown	Challenge Team	New Orleans, Louisiana
		Report		Stadium: Oakland Riding Park

== 1869 ==
=== International matches ===
No international matches were played during the 1869 calendar year.

=== Club matches ===
The following are known American soccer club matches that were played in 1869. Reported matches primarily consisted of men's college soccer teams, mostly of Ivy League schools and military academies.

May 21, 1869	Columbia University	Cancelled	Brooklyn Poly Prep/Adelphia Academy	Brooklyn, New York
		Report		Stadium: Capitoline Grounds

June 2, 1869	Columbia University	Cancelled	Brooklyn Poly Prep/Adelphia Academy	Brooklyn, New York
		Report		Stadium: Capitoline Grounds

October 23, 1869	Washington & Lee University	Cancelled	Virginia Military Institute	Lexington, Virginia
		Report		Stadium: Washington & Lee Drillfield

November 6, 1869	Rutgers University	6–4	Princeton University	Princeton, New Jersey
		Report		Stadium: College Field

November 13, 1869	Princeton University	8–0	Rutgers University	Princeton, New Jersey
		Report		Stadium: College Field

The two matches between Rutgers and Princeton are generally regarded as the first ever games of American football.

== See also ==
- History of soccer in the United States
- Oneida Football Club
- Soccer in the United States
