= Statue of David I. Walsh =

Statue in Boston, Massachusetts, U.S.

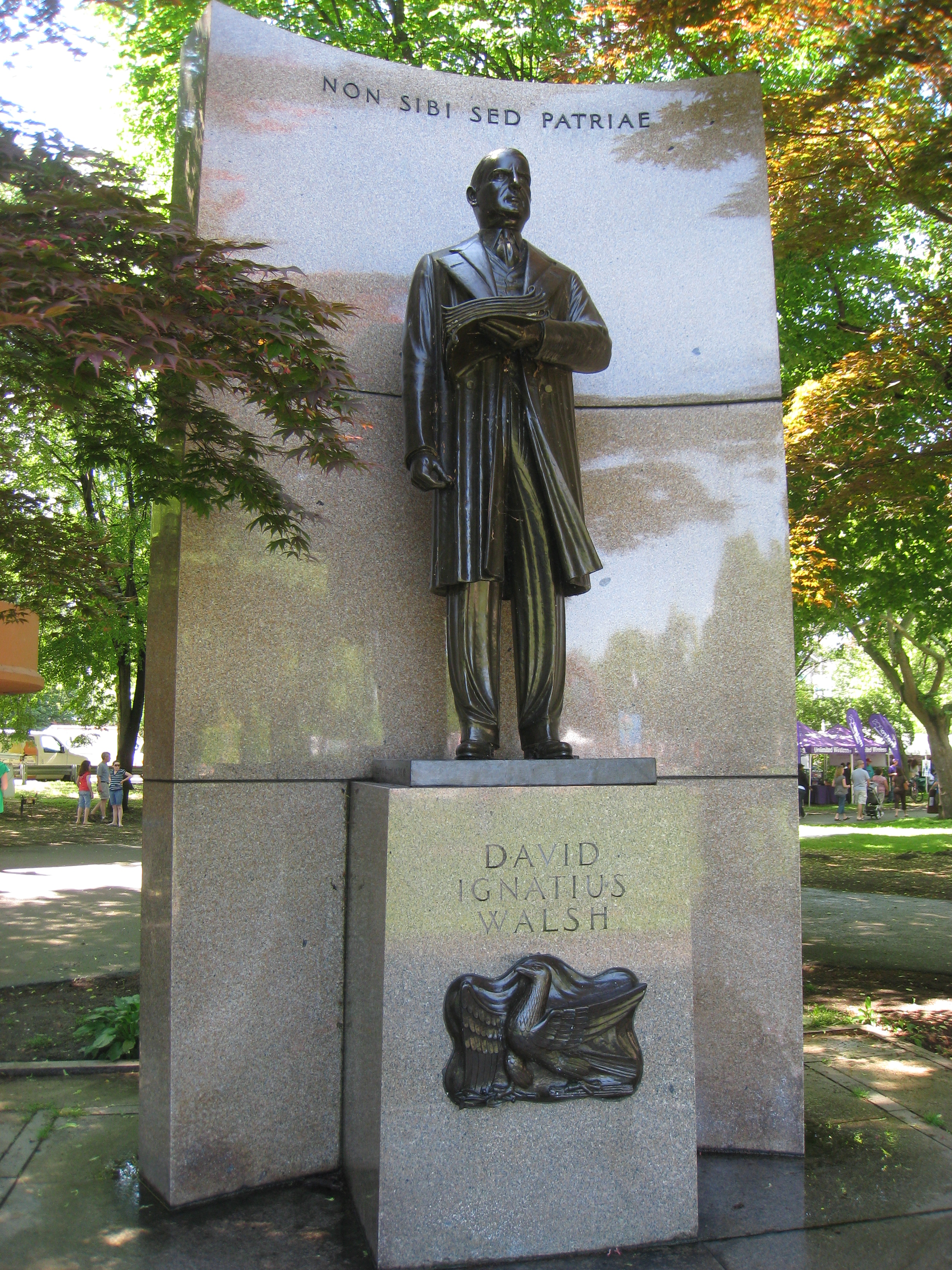
- The memorial in 2009
- Artist: Joseph Arthur Coletti
- Subject: David I. Walsh
- Location: Boston, Massachusetts, U.S.; 42°21′22.5″N 71°4′26.8″W

A statue of David I. Walsh by Joseph Coletti (sometimes called the David Ignatius Walsh Monument or Senator David I. Walsh) is installed along Boston's Charles River Esplanade, in the U.S. state of Massachusetts.

== Description and history ==
The 1954 memorial, which was commissioned by the Metropolitan District Commission, features a bronze sculpture of Walsh that measures approximately 8 x 3 x 3 ft. It is mounted on a square base, which is attached to a curved granite wall. The Latin inscription above the statue says: "Not for himself, but for his country". The front of the base had a bronze relief plaque of an eagle, but was missing when the memorial was surveyed as part of the Smithsonian Institution's "Save Outdoor Sculpture!" program in 1997. Furthermore, the back of the curved wall was also missing two out of three bronze plaques, which depicted the seal of Massachusetts and U.S. Naval Affairs Committee insignia. The bronze plaque remaining, as of 1997, shows an elderly man holding a tablet.

== See also ==
- 1954 in art
