= Oneida Football Club =

First organized team to play any kind of football in the United States

Oneida
- Full name: Oneida Football Club
- Location: Boston, Massachusetts, US
- Founded: 1862
- Dissolved: 1865; 161 years ago (Note: Although the team was dissolved in 1865, self-appointed "club president" Tom McGrath pays a yearly fee of $50 to the city of Boston to keep an organization by that name registered.)
- Club colors: (Note: The team did not have a uniform jersey but a red simple handkerchief.)
- Activities: Boston game football
- Founder: Gerrit Smith Miller
- President: J. Huntington Wolcott (1864–65)

The Oneida Football Club, founded and captained by Gerrit Smith Miller in Boston, Massachusetts, in 1862, was the first organized team to play any kind of football in the United States. The game played by the club, known as the "Boston game", was an informal local variant that combined association and rugby football and predated the codification of rules for American football.

The team, made up of students of Boston's elite preparatory schools, played on Boston Common from 1862 to 1865, during which time they reportedly never lost a game or even gave up a single point.

After Oneida disbanded, former members established the Harvard University Football Club, which continued to play under the Boston game rules.

== History ==
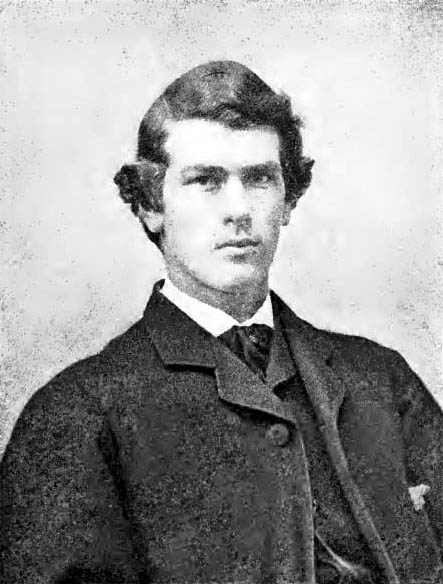
Gerrit Smith Miller, founder and captain of the team

Gerrit Smith Miller started his sports career playing baseball. In 1859, while 14 years old, Miller organized the "Bobolink B.B.C. (Base-Ball Club)" of Peterboro, N. Y., where he was elected president, captain and pitcher. In 1861, he joined the Lowell BBC of Boston, where he was also captain and pitcher. Miller then attended Harvard University, where he was part of its baseball team.

Miller then entered Epes S. Dixwell's school, a private college preparatory school, where football was played as a fun and exercise for students. At the time there were no formal rules for football games, with different schools and areas playing their own variations. This informal style of play was often chaotic and very violent, and Miller had been a star of the game while attending Dixwell. However, he grew tired of these disorganized games so in 1862 he organised the "Oneida Football Club of Boston", choosing players from not only Dixwell's but from other schools in order to form a strong and competitive team. The name was suggested by R. Clifford Watson, after the lake of that name in New York State, not far from Miller's home. The full club had fifty-two players. Among the players were the following: Edward L. Arnold, Robert A. Boit, Edward Bowditch, Walter Brooks, George Davis, Robert M. Lawrence, Gerrit S. Miller (captain), Francis G. Peabody, Winthrop S. Scudder, Louis Thies, Alanson Tucker, R. Clifford Watson, Huntington F. Wolcott (Dixwell); J. Malcolm Forbes, and John P. Hall (Boston English High School); and James D'Wolf Lovett (Boston Latin School). Miller was elected president and Clifford Watson secretary and treasurer, and their only uniform was a red silk handkerchief tied around the head, knotted behind.

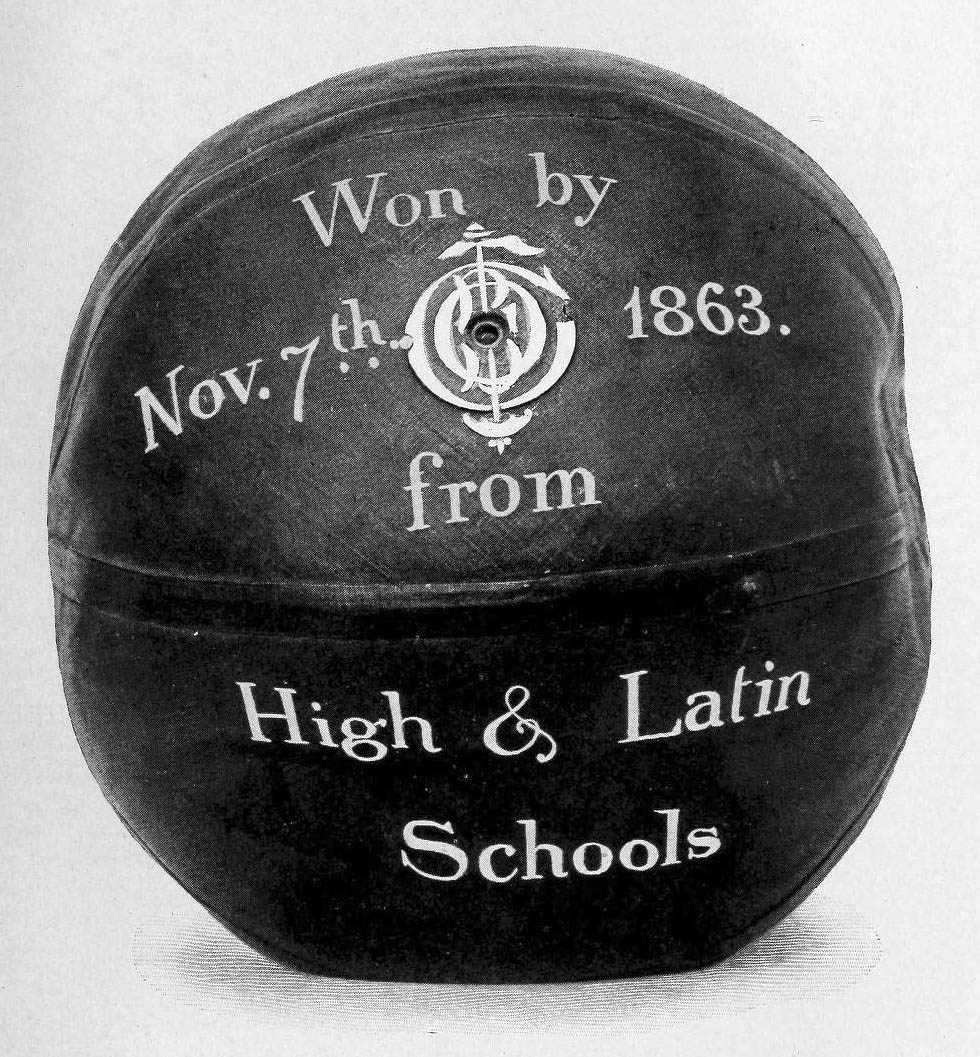
The ball used by Oneida in 1863 was box-shaped with rounded corners

In the 1862 and 1863 seasons the Oneidas played matches with the Boston Latin and the English High schools and one with the combined teams of the Roxbury and Dorchester High Schools, all of which they won. On 7 November 1863 Oneida played vs the combined English High and Boston Public Latin Schools. In that match, the Oneidas allowed their opponents sixteen men, they, themselves, playing their usual fifteen.

In 1864, J. Huntington Wolcott, older brother of future Governor of Massachusetts Roger Wolcott, was elected President of the Oneida Club and in this same year, a challenge was sent to the Harvard freshmen for a match. Although it was accepted, the match was never carried out. Some sources stated that the Harvard upper classes, fearing a defeat, suggested the freshmen not to play.

== Code ==
The game played by the Oneida Football Club is known as the "Boston game". Although it has been claimed by much later followers of both association and American football, the club predated formal rules of any football variant. The Boston game was a more complex form of mob football and is described in period newspapers and diaries as being played in alleyways and empty lots. The Oneidas restricted their activity to Boston Common where it was possible to define goal lines and the edges of the playing field. It is also known that the Oneidas had time limits, multiple twelve-member teams, and some sort of guidelines for fair and foul play.

Around 1871, the "Boston game" took hold at Harvard University and was an important precursor to American football. Harvard Football Club secretary Morton Henry Prince, who was too young to play for the Oneidas but took part in less organized schoolyard versions of the "Boston game" afterwards, may have been responsible for refining the game into the 1873 Harvard University ruleset, which featured kicking, dribbling, and tackling.

== Legacy ==
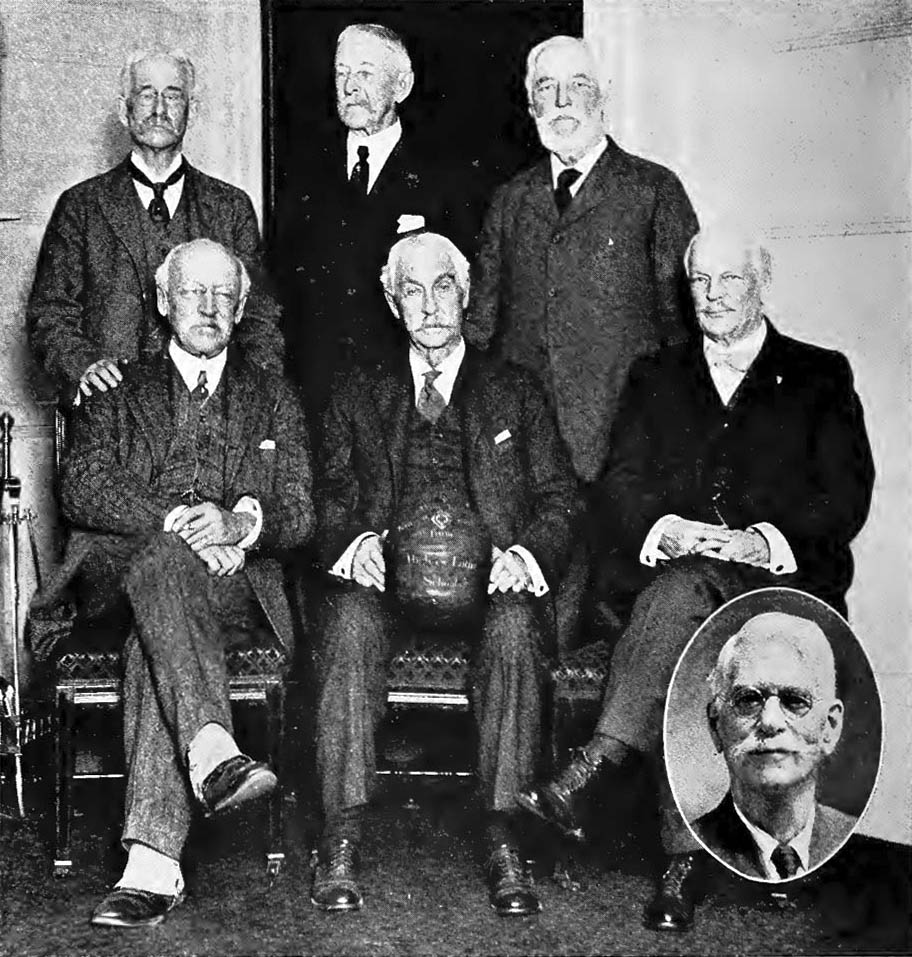
The seven living members of the Oneida F.C. pictured in November 1923, (standing): Scudder, Arnold, Peabody; (seated): Bowditch, Lovett, Lawrence; (insert): Miller

The Boston game developed by Oneida gave rise to the code used in the first (of two) 1874 games between Harvard and McGill Universities, although the Harvard players left them behind after those series.

The ball used in the Oneida match vs the English High and Boston Public Latin Schools combined in November 1863, was treasured by Captain Miller (along with his red handkerchief) for 49 years until in 1922 he presented them to the "Boston Society for the Preservation of New England Antiquities" (now Historic New England), putting them in its Museum, in the old Harrison Gray Otis House, on Cambridge Street, Boston.

On November 7, 1923, a bronze plaque was unveiled in honor of Oneida's founder and captain, Gerrit Smith Miller, at the Noble and Greenough School. The date commemorated the 70th anniversary of the most prominent game won by Oneida. The plaque was inspired on Webb Ellis's dedication as the inventor of rugby football. During the ceremony, a cablegram by Rugby School of England congratulating Miller was received.

Former Oneida player Winthrop S. Scudder wrote a history of the team named Gerrit Smith Miller: An Appreciation, published in 1924. It described the history of the Oneida FC through the life and career of its founder and captain Miller.

On November 21, 1925, surviving members of the club unveiled a stone monument on Boston Common. Its inscription reads: "On this field the Oneida Football Club of Boston, the first organized football club in the United States, played against all comers from 1862 to 1865. The Oneida goal was never crossed". The City of Boston gave permission to the elderly former club members to erect a monument to defend the role of Harvard in the creation of American football, in response to nationwide memorials for Walter Camp earlier that year.

The Oneida football was for a long time on loan to the National Soccer Hall of Fame without specific agreement. In the 2000s, a concerned Bostonian wrote to Historic New England alerting them to the fact that the ball had never been returned. This concerned citizen also arranged for the Oneida monument in Boston Common to be changed back to its original football engraving, replacing the image of a soccer ball which had been placed there by the request of the National Soccer Hall of Fame.

== See also ==
- History of soccer in the United States

== Bibliography ==
- Muscle and Manliness: Rise Of Sport In American Boarding Schools by Axel Bundgaard. Published by Sports and Entertainment (2005) at Google Books - ISBN 978-0815630821
- An Historical Sketch of the Oneida Football Club of Boston: 1862-1865 by Winthrop Saltonstall Scudder - The Massachusetts Historical Society (1926) at HathiTrust Digital Library
