= History of soccer in the United States =

Soccer in the United States has a varied history. Research indicates that the modern game entered the country during the 1850s with New Orleans' Scottish, Irish, German and Italian immigrants. Some of the first organized games, using modern English rules, were played in that city.

== Men's Soccer ==
Early versions of football were played in the present-day United States as early as 1685, and freshmen at Harvard University in 1734 were asked to provide "foot-balls". This resembled modern soccer only in kicking activities, and was often violent. Several sets of rules began to be codified by the 1860s, such as the "Boston game" a combination of rugby football and soccer.

=== Club soccer ===
- Timeline of several known soccer leagues:

Active league Former leagues

==== Oneida Football Club and other teams ====
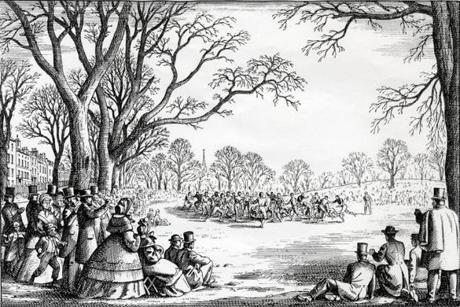
Illustration depicting an Oneida football game, published on The Boston Globe in the 1860s

The Oneida Football Club was established in 1862 by Gerrit Smith "Gat" Miller, a graduate of the Latin School of Epes Sargent Dixwell (a private college-preparatory school in Boston). Oneida is regarded to be the first organized team to play any kind of football in the United States. The game played by the club, known as the "Boston game", was an informal local variant that combined association and rugby football

The team consisted of a group of Boston secondary-school students from relatively elite public (state) schools in the area, such as Boston Latin School and the English High School of Boston. Organization served the club well, and it reportedly never lost a game or allowed a goal.

There were no formal rules for football games, and different schools (and areas) had their own variations. This informal style of play was often chaotic and violent, and Miller was a star while attending Dixwell. He tired of the disorganized games, however, and organized other recent preparatory-school graduates in the first organized football team in the United States.

==== Football at universities ====
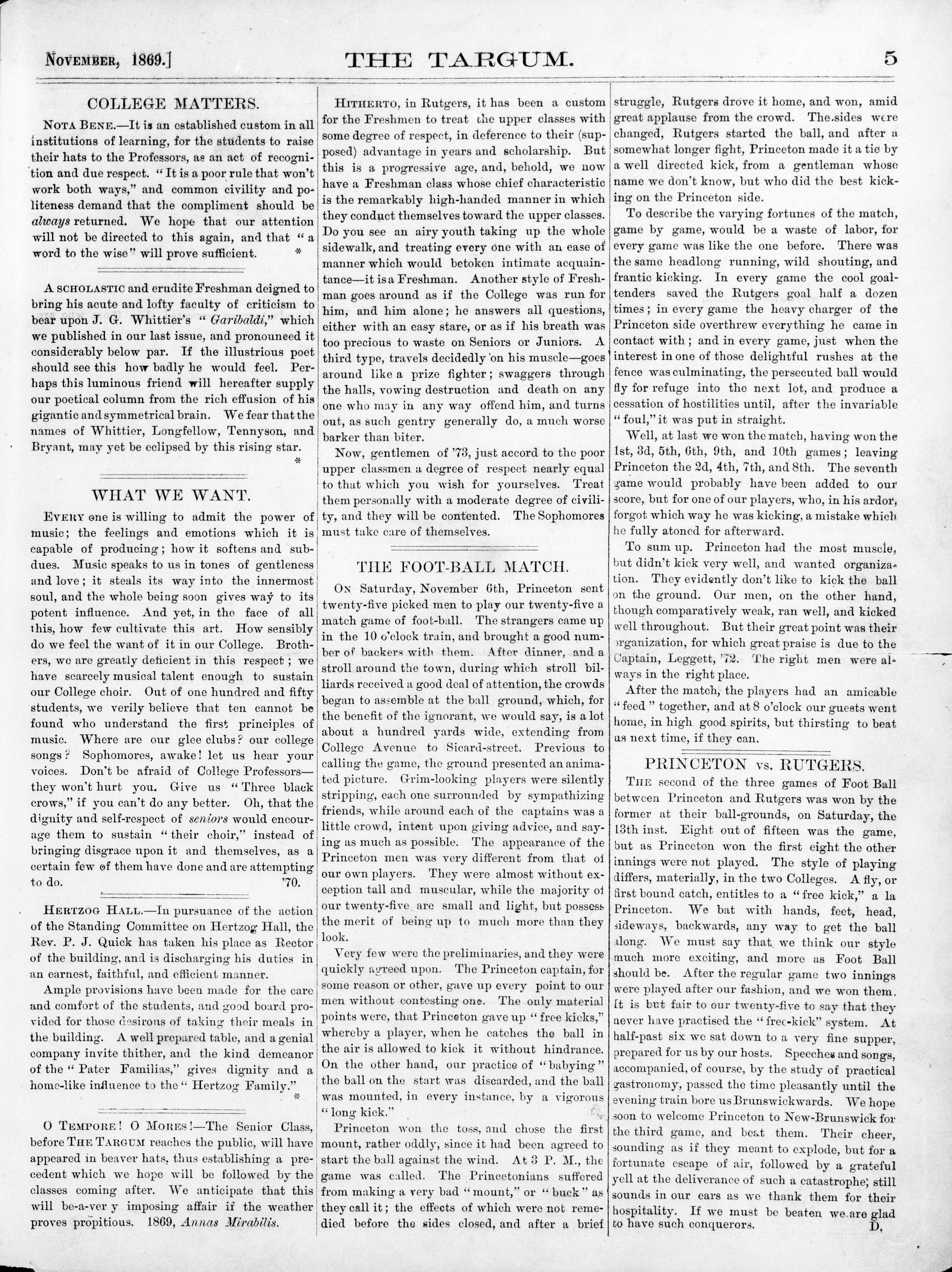
"The Foot-Ball Match" chronicled the first collegiate game between Rutgers and Princeton in The Targum, November 1869

The 1869 Princeton vs. Rutgers football game is often cited as the birth of intercollegiate American football and soccer in the United States, (Note: The ball used in the match is at the National Soccer Hall of Fame.) and was played with rules based on the Football Association's (FA) first set of rules. Although American football began to take hold at eastern universities such as Harvard, Princeton, and Yale, "socker" became popular at Haverford, Columbia, Cornell, and Penn; enthusiasts arranged for English teams to tour the United States to generate interest in the sport in 1905, 1907, and 1909. However, American football became the primary sport at most schools.

The earliest known organized soccer game in the United States was played on October 11, 1866, in Waukesha, Wisconsin, under the 1863 London Football Association laws between Carroll College and Waukesha Town. Carroll won 5–2, and each goal was referred to as "game".

MATCH GAME AT FOOT BALL – There was a match game at foot-ball played between the students of Carroll College and the young men of Waukesha, on Thursday last. The challenge was given by the College boys. The others had the first phase of direction in which to kick but this was changed every time. Seven games were played, of which the college boys won five. The players on the College side numbered 22, on the other side 25 (and were altogether larger men.) The whole game was well contested, and lasted nearly and [sic] hour and a half. The young men of Waukesha have challenged the College boys to play them next Thursday at 3 P.M. on the Fair Grounds, and the challenge has been accepted.

— Match announcement in the Waukesha Freeman, October 16, 1866

==== Immigrant communities ====
Soccer was popular in communities with large immigrant populations. The West Hudson, New Jersey towns of Kearny and Paterson had textile factories established and staffed by British companies, and residents founded the National Association Football League in 1895.

The Fall River, Massachusetts region also had textile companies and many immigrants from England. Its Bristol County League played in 1886 and the Southern New England League played in 1914.

In St. Louis, the Catholic Church introduced soccer into its recreational programs. The St. Louis League was founded in 1886, and modified the FA's rules; so did the St. Louis Soccer League, which was founded in 1903. Other cities where soccer was popular were Chicago, Philadelphia, Detroit, Cincinnati, Cleveland, San Francisco, and Los Angeles.

==== Attempts at a governing body ====
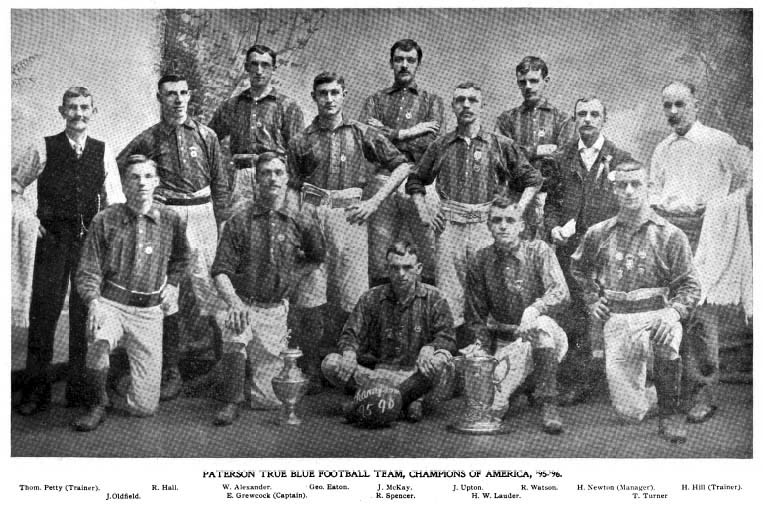
Paterson True Blues, champions of American Cup in 1896

Before the creation of the United States Soccer Federation, soccer in the U.S. was organized at the regional level with no governing body. The country's first non-league organizing body was the American Football Association (AFA), which was founded in 1884. The AFA sought to standardize rules for teams competing in northern New Jersey and southern New York. Within two years, the AFA broadened to include teams in Pennsylvania, Massachusetts, and Rhode Island.

The American League of Professional Football (ALPF) was established by the owners of several National League of Professional Baseball Clubs teams in 1894 to generate revenue during the winter months, when their ballparks were empty. The AFA, displeased with the idea, banned any player who signed a contract with an ALPF team. The ALPF failed to generate much interest despite their financial backing, and the league folded after only 17 days.

==== USFA vs. AFA; FIFA membership ====
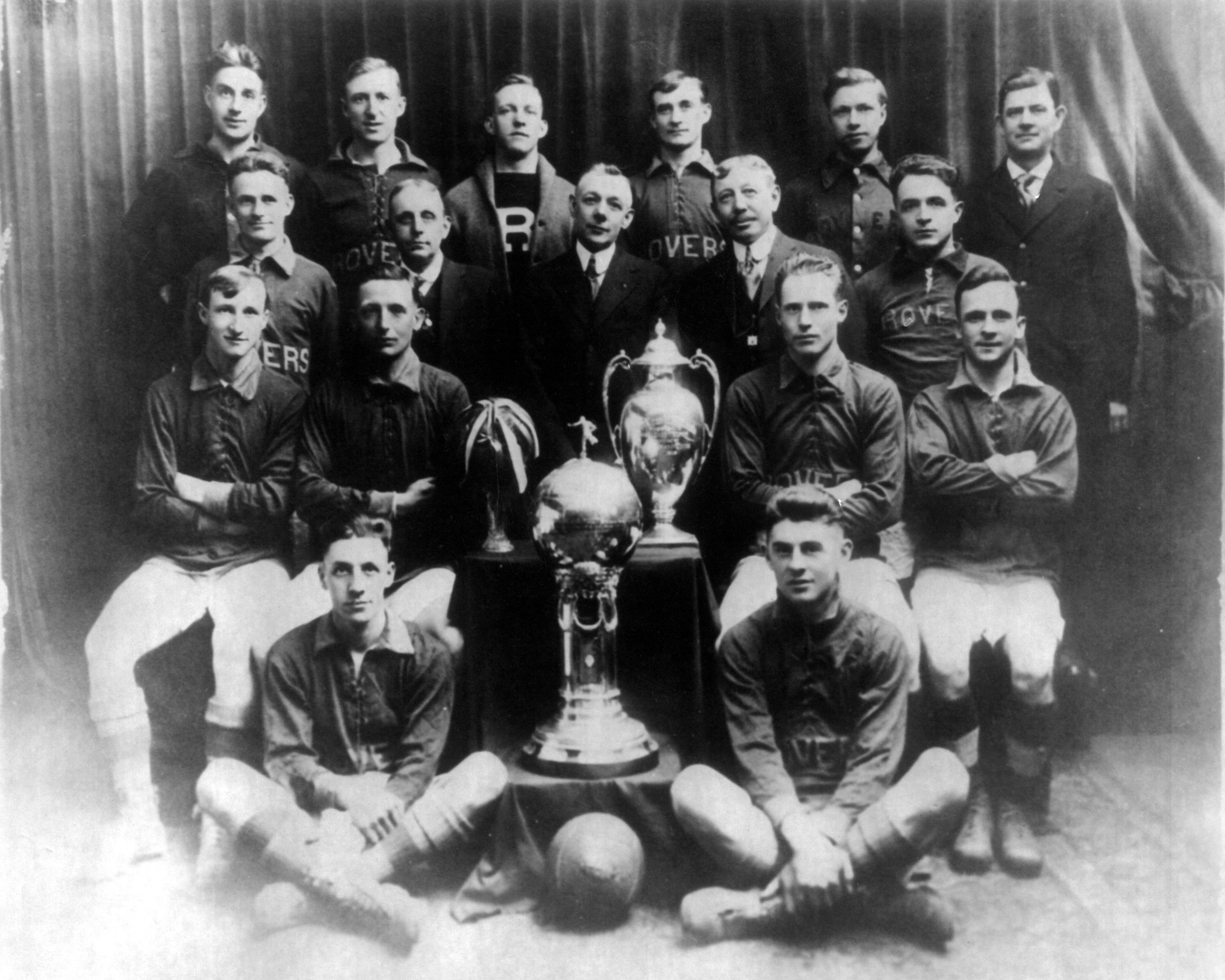
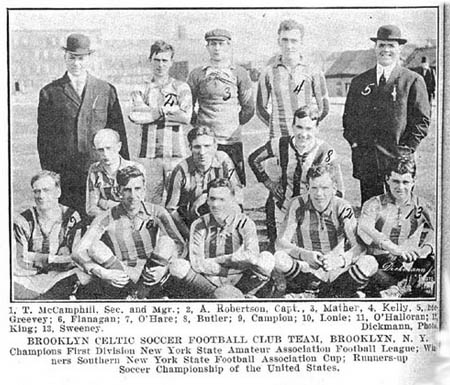
Fall River Rovers (left) and Brooklyn Celtic (right) were among the few clubs to win both competitions, the National Challenge Cup and the American Cup

Within a year of its founding, the AFA organized the American Cup: the first non-league cup in U.S. soccer history. Clubs from New Jersey and Massachusetts dominated its first twelve years. Due to economic conditions and labor unrest, however, teams in the Fall River area (many of whom were sponsored by textile companies) were forced to withdraw in 1894; players who had signed with ALPFB teams were also banned. The AFA suspended the American Cup in 1899; it did not resume until 1906, resulting from interest generated by an English tour the previous year.

In October 1911, the American Amateur Football Association (AAFA) was founded. The association quickly spread beyond the Northeast, and created the short-lived (two years) American Amateur Football Association Cup in 1912.

The AFA and AAFA applied for membership in FIFA, soccer's international governing body, in 1912. Drawing on its position as the older organization and the status of the American Cup, the AFA contendeded that it should be the nationally recognized body. FIFA refused to recognize either group, ruling that only one organization could represent the United States.

In 1913, several AFA organizations moved to the AAFA. The AAFA reorganized as the United States Football Association (USFA) on April 5, 1913, and FIFA quickly granted it provisional membership; the National Challenge Cup was established that fall. That cup quickly grew, overshadowing the American Cup; however, both cups were played simultaneously for the next decade. Declining respect for the AFA led to the withdrawal of several associations from its cup in 1917, and the USFA created the National Amateur Cup in 1924. The last American Cup season was 1924.

==== Soccer wars ====
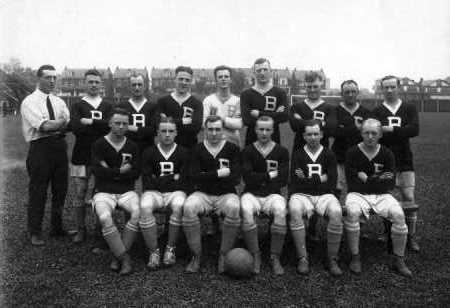
Bethlehem Steel, one of the most successful clubs in the 1910s and 1920s

Near the end of the 1920s, "American Soccer Wars" began: internal conflicts within the American Soccer League and their affiliated clubs participating in the National Challenge Cup. The debate, revolving around whether the United States Football Association or the American Soccer League was the chief organization of American soccer, negatively impacted the sport's reputation and popularity. The ASL collapsed, and the first golden age of American soccer ended.

The initial issue with the ASL had been the scheduling of the National Challenge Cup, which had been burdensome for the ASL season schedule. The cup had typically been played during the ASL off-season, making it difficult for ASL clubs to participate; the ASL boycotted the 1925 Challenge Cup, ostensibly due to scheduling conflicts and lack of cooperation by the USFA. According to American soccer historians, however, the real issue was the ASL's desire to be the premier soccer body in the United States.

In 1927, the conflict intensified as ASL clubs were accused by FIFA of signing European players who were under contract to European clubs. Due to the conflict and apparent ASL corruption, USFA president Andrew M. Brown traveled to Helsinki for the 1927 FIFA Congress in the hope of removing penalties imposed on the ASL and USFA. ASL owners wanted to run their soccer clubs like major-league baseball teams (since many of them owned both), and saw FIFA rulings and the National Challenge Cup as restrictive.

Hoping to break away from the National Challenge Cup, New York Nationals owner Charles Stoneham proposed that the ASL create its own championship tournament to determine the top American soccer club (an early form of playoffs ending a regular season). Stoneham also proposed expanding into the Midwest to include clubs in the Ohio Valley and St. Louis regions, creating a new division for those clubs. His plan involved having the two divisions compete in a regular season, and the top clubs in each division playing in the ASL championship tournament. Before Stoneham's proposal, the National Challenge Cup was seen as the ultimate title in American soccer; most professional leagues were regional, not national.

The American Soccer League, however, operated under a closed-league model with a fixed number of franchises. Unlike the National Challenge Cup, which was open to any USFA-affiliated team, the new tournament (or playoffs) would permanently cap the number of participating clubs. Three teams (Bethlehem Steel, the New York Giants S.C. and the Newark Skeeters) rejected the proposal, played in the 1928 National Challenge Cup, were suspended from the league and fined $1,000. The USFA then suspended the ASL, beginning the "Soccer Wars". Bethlehem Steel, the Giants and the Skeeters did not play in the 1928–29 American Soccer League, joining local semi-professional leagues which were combining to form the Eastern Professional Soccer League.

Support for the USFA from other national federations and the ASL's financial disadvantage as an unsanctioned league eventually convinced the latter that it could not win the "soccer war", and the dispute was settled in early October 1929. The ASL had already begun its 1929–30 season, which was suspended during the settlement; reassembled, it played the rest of the season as the Atlantic Coast League.

==== Great Depression and World War II ====
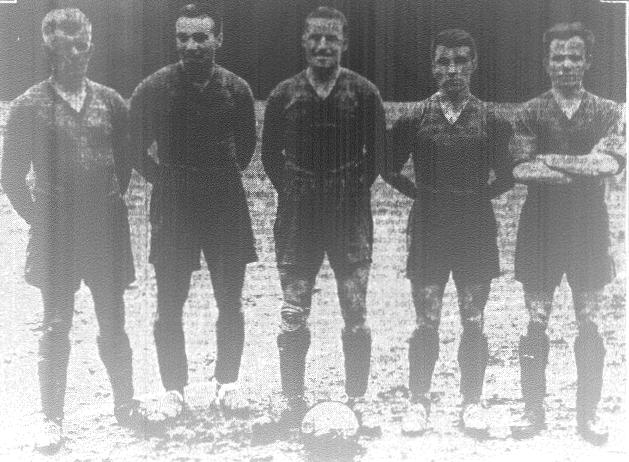
Stix, Baer and Fuller forwards in 1933; the club dominated the Challenge Cup during the 1930s.

Two weeks after the United States Football Association and American Soccer League settlement, the stock market crashed. The Great Depression drastically affected the spring 1930 ASL season; several clubs defaulted, and the clubs played an unequal number of matches. The ASL's struggles did not initially affect its stronger clubs, and the Fall River F.C. completed the double by winning the 1930 season championship and the National Challenge Cup.

As the Depression intensified, the ASL folded after the fall 1932 season (its 15th). Several surviving clubs revived the ASL the following year, but the league could not field teams with the financial means or interest in attracting foreign players. The National Challenge Cup became obscurity.

Despite the decline in soccer's overall popularity, it was still played by ethnic groups and expatriates in several parts of the country (primarily New England and the heartland and the New York City and St. Louis metropolitan areas). Most clubs participating in the Challenge Cup during the late Depression and World War II years were top amateur teams or semi-professional clubs, who hosted a handful of international matches.

==== Second professional age ====
===== Rise of the original NASL =====
In 1967, two professional soccer leagues began in the United States: the FIFA-sanctioned United Soccer Association (which consisted of European and South American teams which were brought to the U.S. and given local names) and the unsanctioned National Professional Soccer League. The NPSL had a national television contract in the U.S. with CBS television network, but the match ratings were unacceptable even by weekend daytime standards and the agreement was canceled. The leagues merged in 1968 to form the North American Soccer League (NASL), which lasted until 1984.

===== Pele and the New York Cosmos =====
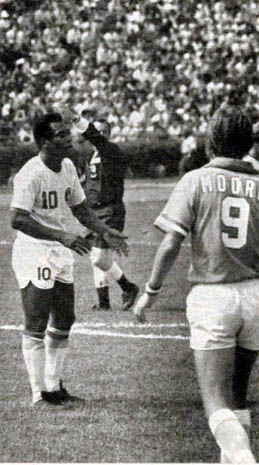
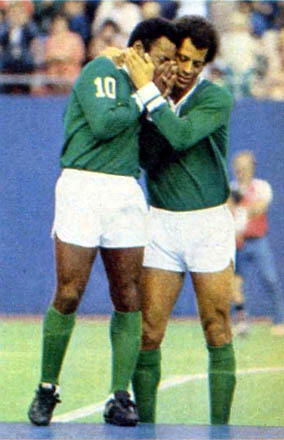
Two moments of Pelé with the Cosmos, (left): his debut v Dallas Tornado, 1975; (right): his farewell at Giants Stadium; in the image, he is consoled by teammate Carlos Alberto after his farewell speech

The most successful club in the league was the New York Cosmos, who attracted over 40,000 fans per game at their height with ageing superstars Pelé (Brazil) and Franz Beckenbauer (Germany). Past their prime by the time they joined the NASL, Pelé was considered the world's best forward and Beckenbauer the best defender. The 73,000-plus-seat Giants Stadium sold out for their 1978 championship victory.

===== Decline and collapse of the NASL =====
Over-expansion was an important factor in the NASL's demise. New franchises were awarded quickly; the league doubled in size in a few years, peaking at 24 teams. Many new owners were unfamiliar with soccer, and got out as fast as they came in when they thought that the sport's popularity was beginning to decline. Over-payment for ageing stars in an effort to match the Cosmos' success led to large financial losses. FIFA decided to award the 1986 World Cup to Mexico after Colombia withdrew, disappointing the U.S. When only the Minnesota Strikers and Toronto Blizzard were interested in playing, the NASL suspended operations on March 28, 1985.

==== MLS: 1996-present ====
Following the 1994 World Cup staged in the United States, a new professional soccer league, the MLS was launched in 1996. MLS was the first major soccer league in the country after NASL folded in 1984 and initially featured 10 teams. Once Don Garber assumed the role of the league's commissioner in 1999, MLS met great success and massive expansion to a total of 30 teams, as of 2025.

=== Men's national team ===
==== 1930s ====
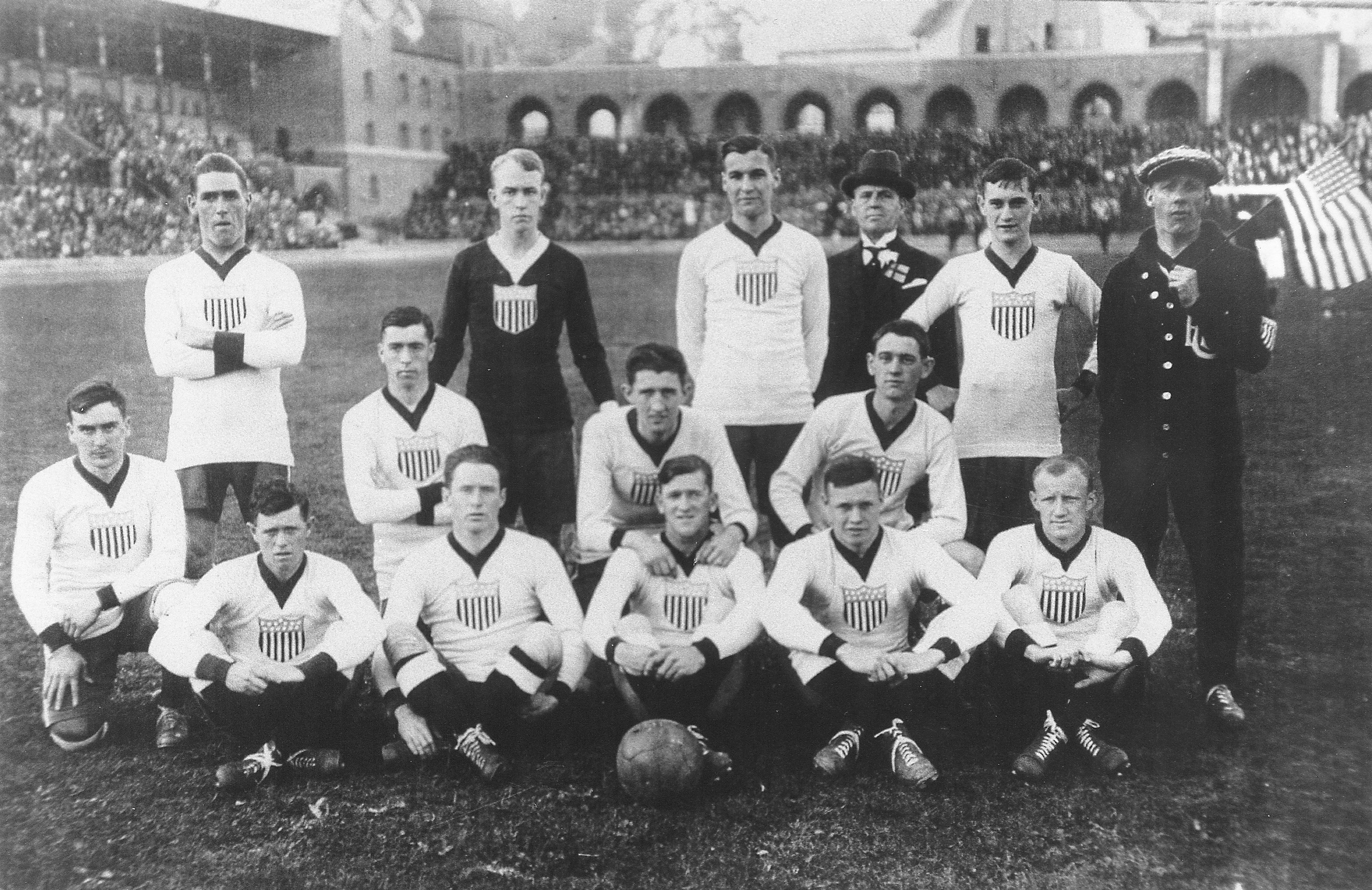
The first U.S. men's team in 1916 at Stockholm Olympic Stadium, Sweden

The U.S. finished third in the 1930 World Cup, defeating Belgium 3–0 at Estadio Gran Parque Central in Montevideo, Uruguay. The match was played simultaneously with another match across town at Estadio Pocitos, where France defeated Mexico.

In the next match, the United States defeated Paraguay 3–0. For many years, FIFA credited Bert Patenaude with the first and third goals and his teammate Tom Florie with the second. Other sources said that the second goal was scored by Patenaude or by Paraguay's Ramon Gonzales. In November 2006, FIFA announced that it had accepted evidence from "various historians and football fans" that Patenaude scored all three goals and was the first person to score a hat trick in a World Cup match.

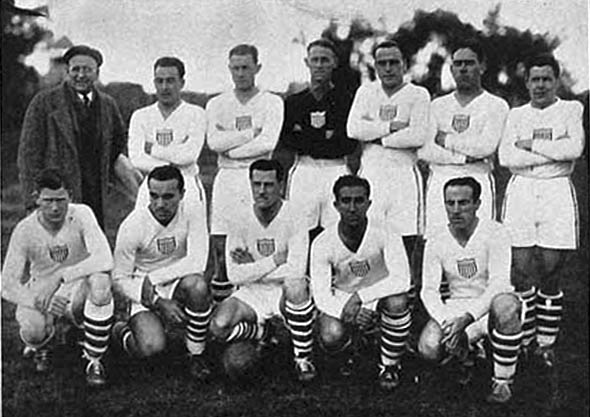
The U.S. national men's team at the 1930 World Cup

After reaching the semifinals with two wins, the American side lost 6–1 to Argentina. Using the overall tournament records, FIFA credited the U.S. with a third-place finish (ahead of fellow semi-finalist Yugoslavia). The finish is the team's best World Cup result, and is the highest finish of any team outside CONMEBOL and UEFA (the South American and European confederations, respectively).

FIFA said that a tournament at the 1932 Los Angeles Olympics would not be popular in the United States, and it would not be cost-effective to host such a tournament in hard economic times. The Olympic tournament was reinstated in 1936.

==== 1970s–1990s ====
After the enthusiasm caused by the creation and rise of the North American Soccer League during the 1970s, it was hoped that the U.S. men's national team would soon become a powerful force in world soccer. Such hopes were not realized, however.

From 1981 to 1983, only two international matches were played. To provide a more stable national-team program and renew interest in the NASL, U.S. Soccer entered the national team into the league for the 1983 season as Team America. The team lacked the continuity and regular training of conventional clubs, and many players were unwilling to play for the team instead of their own clubs. Team America finished the season at the bottom of the league, and U.S. Soccer withdrew the team from the NASL.

The organization then targeted the 1984 Summer Olympics in Los Angeles and the 1986 World Cup to rebuild the national team and its fan base. The International Olympic Committee ruled that teams outside Europe and South America could field full senior teams, including professionals; the amateur-only rule had favored socialist countries from Eastern Europe, whose players were de facto professionals. The U.S. did well at the Olympics, beating Costa Rica, tying Egypt, and losing only to favorite Italy. With a 1–1–1 record, the team did not advance to the second round, losing to Egypt on a tiebreaker; both countries had three points.

By the end of 1984, the NASL had folded and no senior outdoor soccer league was operating in the United States. Many top American players, including John Kerr, Paul Caligiuri, Eric Eichmann, and Bruce Murray, moved overseas (primarily to Europe).

The United States bid to host the 1986 World Cup after Colombia withdrew due to economic concerns. Mexico was chosen over the U.S. and Canada to host the tournament, despite concerns that it would have to be moved again because a major earthquake struck Mexico shortly before the tournament.

In the last game of the qualifying tournament, the U.S. needed to draw against Costa Rica (whom it had defeated 3–0 in the Olympics the year before) to reach the final qualification group against Honduras and Canada. U.S. Soccer scheduled the game at El Camino College in Torrance, California (an area with many Costa Rican expatriates), and marketed the game almost exclusively to the Costa Rican community; Costa Rican folk dances were the halftime entertainment. A 35th-minute goal by Evaristo Coronado won the match for Costa Rica and kept the United States from reaching its fourth World Cup finals.

U.S. Soccer tried to re-implement its national-team-as-club concept in 1988, offering contracts to national-team players to build an international team with a club ethos. Players were loaned out to their club teams, saving U.S. Soccer the expense of their salaries. This brought many key veterans back to the team; the NASL's success a decade earlier had created an influx of talent from burgeoning grass-roots-level clubs and youth programs. U.S. Soccer wanted to establish a more stable foundation for the 1990 World Cup than had existed in the past.

==== 21st century ====
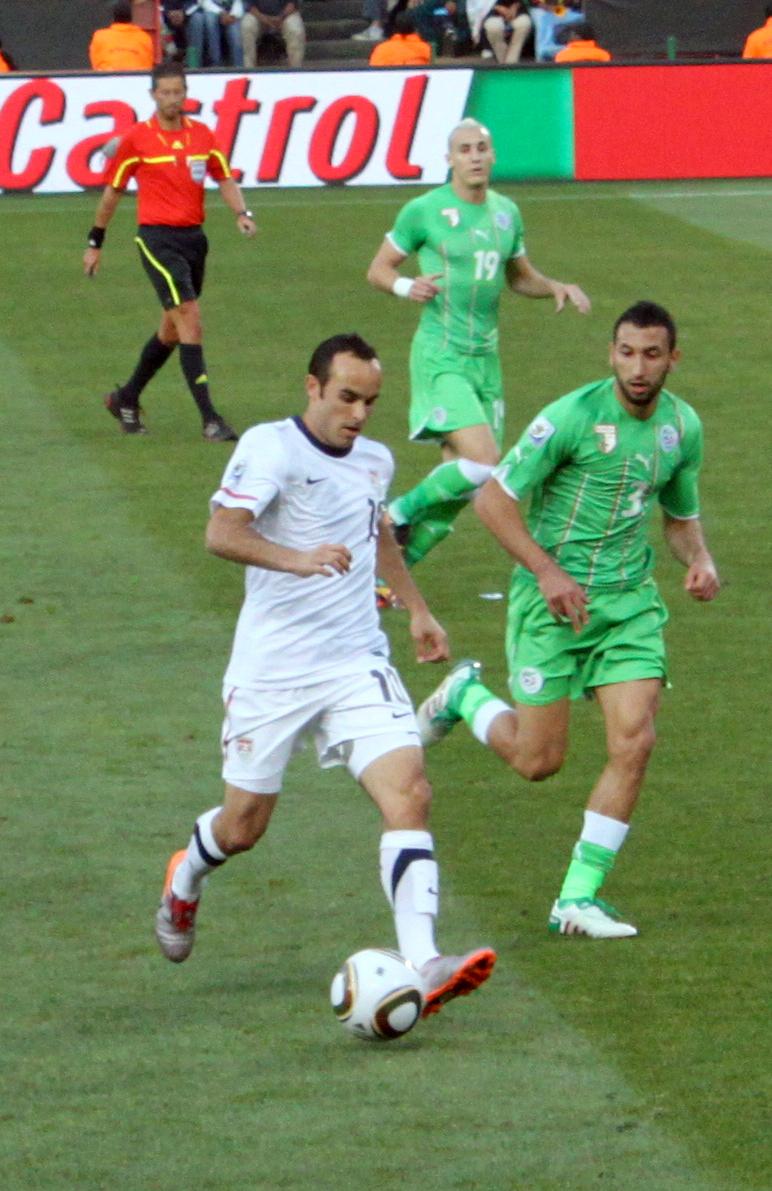
Landon Donovan at the 2010 World Cup

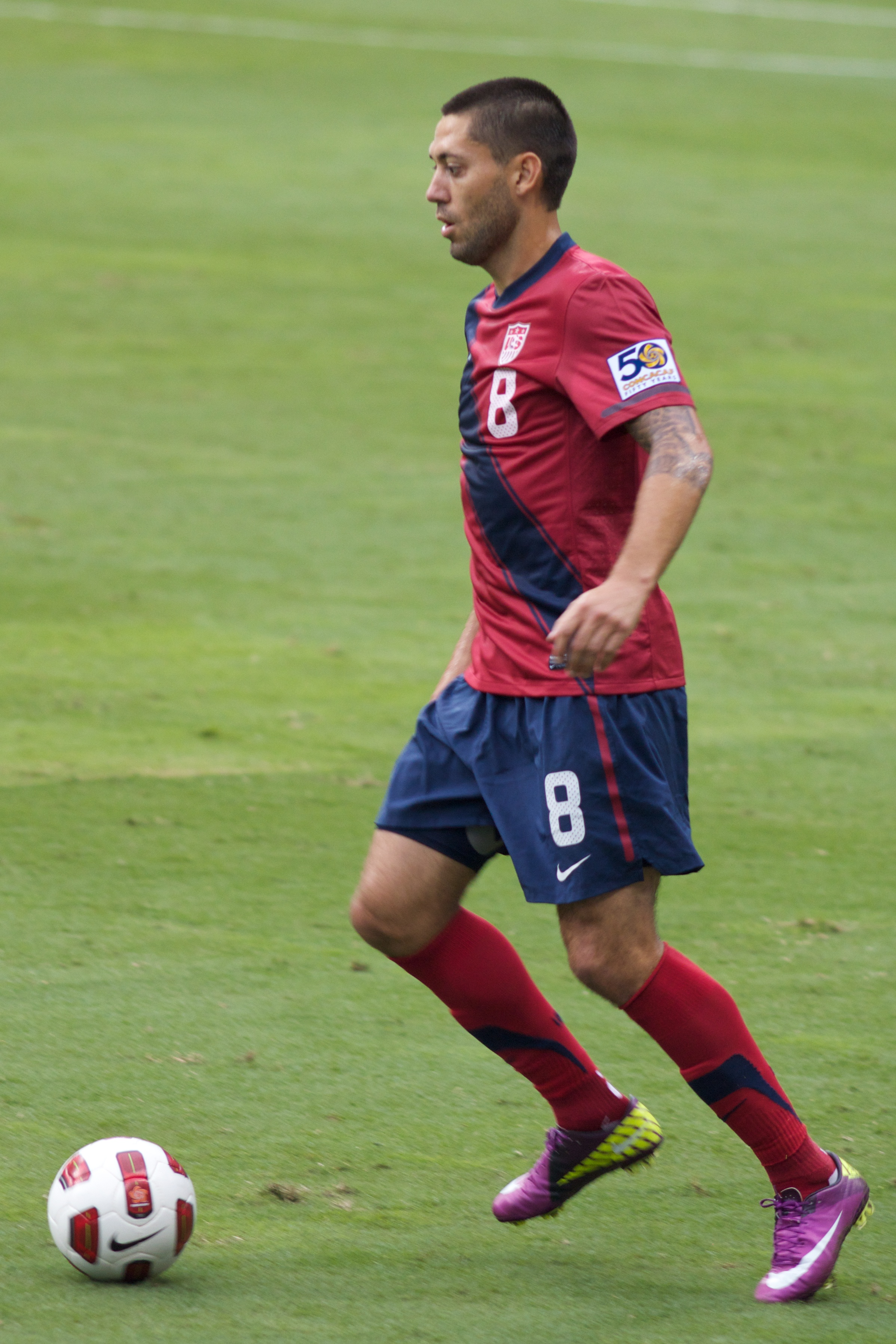
Clint Dempsey with the U.S. in 2011

Bruce Arena failed to maintain his 2002 success at the 2006 World Cup and was replaced by national-team assistant and Chivas USA manager Bob Bradley, whose tenure began with four wins and one draw in friendlies leading up to the 2007 Gold Cup (hosted by the United States). The U.S. won all three of its group-stage matches against Guatemala, Trinidad and Tobago, and El Salvador. After a 2–1 win over Panama in the quarterfinals, the country defeated Canada 2–1 in the semifinals. The U.S. came from behind in the final to defeat Mexico, 2–1.

The team's disappointing 2007 Copa América campaign ended after three defeats in the group stage to Argentina, Paraguay, and Colombia. The decision by U.S. Soccer to field what was considered a second-tier team was questioned by fans and the media.

A hallmark of Bradley's tenure as national-team manager was his willingness to cap a large number of players, many for the first time. The practice was praised by advocates of a more diverse player pool, and criticized by those hoping for more consistency and leadership from core players. Young American players such as Freddy Adu, Jozy Altidore, Clint Dempsey, Maurice Edu, Brad Guzan, Eddie Johnson and Michael Parkhurst moved from MLS to European clubs, gaining experience at the highest levels of club and international soccer.

In the summer of 2009, the U.S. was drawn into Group B with Brazil, Egypt, and Italy in the Confederations Cup. After losing 3–1 to Italy and 3–0 to Brazil, the U.S. rallied to finish second in the group and reach the semi-final on the second tie-breaker (goals scored); on the final day of group play, they defeated Egypt 3–0 and Brazil won 3–0 against Italy.

In the semifinals, the U.S. defeated Spain 2–0; Spain topped the FIFA World Rankings, and was on a record run of 35 undefeated games (a record shared with Brazil) and 15 consecutive wins. The U.S. advanced to its first final in a men's FIFA tournament before losing 3–2 to Brazil, after leading 2–0 at half-time.

A few days after the Confederations Cup final, the U.S. hosted the CONCACAF Gold Cup and was drawn into Group B with Grenada, Haiti, and Honduras. Since the country had just played in the Confederations Cup and still had half of its World Cup qualifying campaign to go, Bradley chose a side consisting primarily of reserves who had never played together on the international stage and was criticized for doing so. The U.S. began group play with a pair of victories over Grenada and Honduras, and won the group with a draw against Haiti.

The U.S. defeated Panama, 2–1, after extra time in the quarterfinals. In the semifinals, they faced Honduras for the second time in the tournament and the third time in less than two months. The U.S. defeated Honduras 2–0 and advanced to its third consecutive Gold Cup final, where the team faced Mexico in a rematch of the 2007 Gold Cup final. The U.S. lost 5–0 in its first home loss to Mexico since 1999, breaking its 58-match unbeaten streak against CONCACAF opponents in the country.

The team qualified for the 2010 FIFA World Cup atop their group, and was drawn into Group C with England, Slovenia, and Algeria. Despite an early goal by Steven Gerrard, the U.S. drew 1–1 with England in its first match after a save by Rob Green off Clint Dempsey bounced off Green's hands and rolled into the goal. The team was down 2–0 against Slovenia before tying the game, 2–2. In its third (and final) group stage-game against Algeria, Landon Donovan scored in the 91st minute to win the game – and the group – 1–0. The U.S. then played Ghana, losing 2–1 in extra time, and were eliminated from the tournament.

In the 2011 CONCACAF Gold Cup final, the U.S. led Mexico 2–0 at halftime before losing 3–2. After the defeat, Bradley was replaced by former Bayern Munich and Germany manager Jürgen Klinsmann. The team defeated Mexico 1–0 in the Azteca Stadium in 2012 for the first time and defeated world-number-three Italy in Italy, the first away victory against a top-four opponent. The U.S. topped its group of four in the second stage of CONCACAF World Cup qualification, and Jamaica was second.

The team defeated Costa Rica 1–0 in a Denver match known as the Show Clasico before drawing against Mexico in Azteca for its second qualification point in that country. The U.S. defeated Germany 4–2 in the Centennial Match, and Jamaica, Panama, and Honduras to take a commanding lead of the Hex. In the 2013 CONCACAF Gold Cup, the United States fielded a younger team of players who were attempting to win their way onto the senior squad (including Landon Donovan, who was returning from a sabbatical). The team was undefeated, defeating Panama 1–0 in the final. The U.S. then defeated Bosnia-Herzegovina before losing to Belgium and ending a 13-game winning streak. The team lost to Costa Rica before defeating Mexico 2–0 in the Hex to qualify for the 2014 FIFA World Cup, and Klinsmann received a four-year contract extension.

The U.S. was drawn in a Group G "Group of Death" for the 2014 World Cup with Germany, Portugal, and Ghana. The team defeated Ghana 2–1 with an 89th-minute John Brooks header before drawing 2–2 against Portugal in extra time. The U.S. lost to Germany and lost 1–0, advancing from the group on goal difference, before a 2–1 extra-time defeat by Belgium in which Tim Howard set a single-match World Cup record of 16 saves.

The team finished fifth in the final round of the qualifying cycle for the 2018 FIFA World Cup, its first World Cup miss since 1986. The U.S. made the knockout rounds of the 2022 World Cup in Qatar, where it finished second in its group (behind England and ahead of Iran and Wales), before it was defeated 3-1 by the Netherlands in the round of 16.

== Women's soccer ==
=== Club soccer ===
==== W-League and WPSL ====
Originally known as the United States Interregional Women's League, the W-League was formed in 1995 as the first national women's soccer league and was a professional outlet for many of the country's top female soccer players. Originally the Western Division of the W-League, the Women's Premier Soccer League broke away, formed a league in 1997 and had its inaugural season in 1998. Both were considered the premier women's soccer leagues in the United States, but fell to second-tier status with the formation of the Women's United Soccer Association in 2000.

==== Women's United Soccer Association (2000–2003) ====
As a result of the U.S. women's national team's (USWNT) first-place showing in the 1999 FIFA Women's World Cup, a seemingly-viable market for the sport germinated. Feeding on their victory, the twenty USWNT players and the Discovery Channel's John Hendricks sought investors, markets, and players to form an eight-team league in February 2000; the league played its first season in April 2001. It was world's first women's soccer league in which all players were paid as professionals. The eight teams were the Atlanta Beat, Boston Breakers, Carolina Courage, New York Power, Philadelphia Charge, San Diego Spirit, San Jose CyberRays (the Bay Area CyberRays in 2001), and the Washington Freedom.

The U.S. Soccer Federation approved the Women's United Soccer Association (WUSA) as a sanctioned Division 1 women's professional soccer league on August 18, 2000. The WUSA announced plans to play in eight cities in 2001: Atlanta, the Bay Area, Boston, New York, Orlando, Philadelphia, San Diego and Washington, D.C. Led by Hendricks, the WUSA planned a cooperation agreement in which the league would work with Major League Soccer to maximize the success of both Division I leagues. The WUSA played for three seasons and suspended operations on September 15, 2003, due to financial problems and lack of public interest.

==== WSII (2004–2009) ====
With the WUSA on hiatus, the WPSL and the USL W-League regained their status as the premier women's soccer leagues in the United States; many former WUSA players joined their teams. The Washington Freedom was the only WUSA team to continue operations after the league dissolved (although new versions of the Atlanta Beat and Boston Breakers formed in 2009), and became part of the W-League in 2006. The WUSA Reorganization Committee was formed in September 2003, which led to the Women's Soccer Initiative, Inc. (WSII). The WSII's goal was "promoting and supporting all aspects of women's soccer in the United States", including a new professional league. Initial plans were to play a scaled-down WUSA schedule in 2004. The WUSA held WUSA Festivals in Los Angeles and Blaine, Minnesota in June 2004, with matches between reconstituted WUSA teams to keep the league in the public eye and sustain interest in women's professional soccer. A 2005 relaunch fell through, and WSII announced in June 2006 that the league would relaunch for the 2008 season.

In December 2006, WSII announced that it had reached an agreement with six owner-operators of teams based in Chicago, Dallas, Los Angeles, St. Louis, Washington, D.C., and a sixth city. In September 2007, the launch was postponed from spring 2008 to 2009 to avoid conflicting with the 2007 Women's World Cup and the 2008 Olympic Games and to ensure that all the teams were prepared for long-term operations.

==== Women's Professional Soccer (2009–2012) ====
The new professional league's name and logo were announced on January 17, 2008. The league would have its inaugural season in 2009, with seven teams, including the former WUSA Washington Freedom. Twenty-one U.S. national team players were allocated to each of the seven teams in September 2008. That month, the league also held the 2008 WPS International Draft. Unlike the WUSA, WPS took "a local, grassroots approach", and "a slow and steady growth type of approach." WPS also tried to have a closer relationship with Major League Soccer to cut costs.

The seven teams which played in the inaugural season of WPS were the Boston Breakers, Chicago Red Stars, FC Gold Pride, Los Angeles Sol, magicJack (originally Washington Freedom), Sky Blue FC, and Saint Louis Athletica. Most teams considered the first season a moderate success (despite many losing more money than anticipated), but began to see problems in 2010. Overall attendance that year was noticeably down from 2009, teams were struggling with financial problems, and WPS changed leadership by the end of the season. The success of the United States women's national soccer team at the 2011 FIFA Women's World Cup resulted in an upsurge in attendance league-wide and interest in new teams for the 2012 season. Internal organizational struggles, including an ongoing legal battle with magicJack owner Dan Borislow, and lack of investment in the league lead to a suspension of the 2012 season which was announced in January of that year. On May 18, 2012, WPS announced that the league had ceased operations after three seasons.

==== WPSL Elite (2012) ====
Until 2012, the WPSL and W-League were the two semi-pro leagues in the United States under WUSA and WPS. When WPS disbanded, they regained their status as the country's premier women's soccer leagues. In response to the suspension (and eventual end) of WPS, the Women's Premier Soccer League created the Women's Premier Soccer League Elite (WPSL Elite) to support the sport. For the 2012 season, the league fielded former WPS teams Boston Breakers, Chicago Red Stars and Western New York Flash, and many WPSL teams. Six of the eight teams were considered fully professional. Many members of the USWNT remained unattached for the 2012 season, and others chose to play in the W-League instead of WPSL Elite.

==== National Women's Soccer League (2013–present) ====
After the WPS folded in 2012, the United States Soccer Federation (USSF) held a round-table discussion of the future of women's professional soccer which led to the creation of the National Women's Soccer League (NWSL). The league was scheduled to launch in 2013 with 12 to 16 teams from WPS, the W-League, and the WPSL. In November 2012, it was announced that the league would have eight teams and would be funded by the USSF, the Canadian Soccer Association (CSA) and the Mexican Football Federation (FMF). The USSF would fund up to 24 players, the CSA up to 16, and the FMF a minimum of 12. Former WPS teams Western New York Flash, Boston Breakers, Chicago Red Stars, and Sky Blue FC were joined by four other teams for the inaugural season. Each club was allowed a minimum of 18 players on its roster, with a maximum of 20 during the season.

In 2013, the Houston Dynamo of MLS expressed interest in forming a women's team. By December of that year, the NWSL approved the Houston Dash (run by the Dynamo organization) for expansion in 2014. After the media boom of the 2015 FIFA Women's World Cup, MLS' Orlando City SC was also interested in forming a women's team for the 2016 season. On October 20, 2015, it was announced that Orlando City would launch the Orlando Pride in 2016. The league became self-governing in 2020 after its management deal with the USSF expired, and expanded to 12 teams for the 2022 season. That season was the first without a player-allocation system; Mexico withdrew from the system after establishing Liga MX Femenil in 2017, and the allocation system for American and Canadian national teams players ended after the 2021 season. The NWSL is the first professional women's league to reach nine teams (with the addition of the Houston Dash), and the first to last more than three seasons.

==== Folding of the W-League and creation of United Women's Soccer ====
The W-League, a Division II development organization and league for 21 seasons, announced on November 6, 2015, that it would cease operations before the 2016 season. In response to the folding of the W-League and problems in the WPSL (the other Division II league), United Women's Soccer (UWS) was founded as a planned second-division pro-am women's league. There were eight known teams, with plans to create two conferences for the inaugural 2016 season.

=== Women's national team ===
==== 1980s ====
Mike Ryan was named the first national-team coach after his success with the Tacoma Cozars, who won three consecutive national titles. A national women's team was selected in 1982, 1983, and 1984, but did not play together. About 70 women, mostly players from university teams, were invited to Baton Rouge, Louisiana, to participate in the 1985 Olympic Sports Festival. At the end of the festival, Ryan selected 17 players for a tournament in Italy. The players practiced for three days at the C.W. Post campus of Long Island University. They were issued men's practice uniforms, and sewed "USA" decals on the front of their shirts the night before they flew to Italy.

The national team's matches against Italy were difficult, and Ryan's coaching was criticized. He was replaced after the Italy trip by Anson Dorrance, who had begun to build the most successful collegiate women's program in history at North Carolina. Dorrance built a national team with a core of young players, using a 3–4–3 formation. Dorrance had been told that if the team did not perform, he would be removed; this put pressure on the team to do well. They team played for no money, traveled third-class, stayed in cheap motels, and had little food. Attendance at matches was low throughout the decade.

In 1988, FIFA hosted an invitational in China to see if a women's World Cup was feasible. The U.S. women's national team participated in the tournament, advancing from the group stage before losing to Norway in the quarter-finals.

===== 1991 Women's World Cup =====
The U.S. team took part in the first CONCACAF Women's Championship in 1991, which determined CONCACAF's qualifier for the 1991 Women's World Cup. The tournament was held from April 18 to 27, 1991, in Port-au-Prince, Haiti. The U.S. won its group and knockout-stage matches, qualifying to the World Cup.

FIFA held the first FIFA Women's World Cup in China in 1991, with 12 teams participating. The U.S. team included Joy Fawcett, Shannon Higgins, Kristine Lilly, Julie Foudy, Michelle Akers, Mia Hamm, April Heinrichs, Carla Overbeck and Carin Jennings. Winning all six of its games, the team outscored its opponents 25–5. It won its three group matches to finish first in the group, defeated Taipei in the quarterfinals, and Germany 5–2 in the semifinals. The United States' 2–1 victory against Norway in the final made it the first U.S. soccer team to win a World Cup.

The team expected fanfare when it returned to the United States. This was not the case, however, and it was out of money. There was no training or games, and many players returned to college. The team did not play another match for nine months after the World Cup, and played only two matches in 1992.

==== 1993–1994 ====
The team rebounded in 1993, playing more matches than the previous year; attendance also increased. The U.S. team participated in the 1993 CONCACAF Women's Championship in Long Island, New York, winning all of their matches.

In 1994, the main task of the women's national team was to qualify for the 1995 Women's World Cup. In preparation for the qualifying tournament, the team competed in the inaugural edition of the Algarve Cup in Portugal. The U.S. finished first in its group before losing to Norway in the final, reversing the 1991 Women's World Cup Final. The Algarve Cup was followed by victories against Trinidad and Tobago and Canada. The U.S. team then participated in the inaugural USA Women's Cup with Germany, China and Norway, their strongest rival. The team won all three matches, including a 4–1 victory against Norway, to take the USA Women's Cup 1994. The August 1994 CONCACAF Women's Championship determined CONCACAF's two qualifiers for the 1995 FIFA Women's World Cup, and the team easily won the tournament to qualify for its second World Cup.

==== 1995 ====
The women's national team spent the first part of 1995 preparing for the World Cup, and again played in the March Algarve Cup in Portugal. They began the tournament well before a loss to Denmark put them in the third-place match against Norway, which the U.S. lost in penalty kicks. Their next tournament was the Tournoi International Feminin in France the following month. The team won all its matches, including a 3–0 victory against host France. They spent the final two months before the World Cup practicing and winning six friendlies – against Finland (2–0 and 6–0), Brazil (3–0 and 4–1), and Canada (9–1 and 2–1) – two weeks before the World Cup.

In the June 1995 FIFA Women's World Cup, the U.S. won its group with victories against Denmark and Australia and a draw against China. During the Denmark match, goalkeeper Brianna Scurry received a red card for handling outside the penalty area and faced a two-game suspension. Since the U.S. had already used their three substitutions, they finished the game with Mia Hamm in goal. The U.S. defeated Japan 4–0 in the quarterfinals, pitting them against Norway. Michelle Akers, injured earlier in the tournament, returned at less than full strength. The favored U.S. lost 1–0, placing third after defeating China 2–0.

The team then played in the July and August USA Women's Cup in New Britain, Connecticut. They won all their matches, including a 2–1 victory against World Cup champion Norway, to take the cup.

==== 1996 ====
The national team entered the Brazil Soccer Cup in January 1996 and won all four matches; the championship game against Brazil resulted in a draw, but the U.S. prevailed in penalty kicks. The U.S. then began preparing for the Olympics, the first time women's soccer would be played at the games. They began their preparation with a series of friendlies, including two matches against Norway which resulted in one win and one loss. The team again played in the May USA Women's Cup, winning all their matches.

Before the 1996 Olympics, a dispute arose between the players and the United States Soccer Federation (USSF). Team members, who received $1,000 a month, wanted to receive bonuses for any medal won (like the men's team); the USSF offered a bonus only for a gold medal. Several players boycotted January the training camp because of the dispute, which was settled with the players returning.

Women's soccer was played for the first time at the Olympics in Atlanta. In the group stage, the U.S. had two wins (against Denmark and Sweden) and a draw against China. In the semifinals, the team again faced Norway; after falling behind during the first half, they tied the game with a penalty shot late in the second half and won in extra time. The U.S. defeated China, 2–1, in the Olympic final for the gold medal. By the time the games were over, the top thirteen crowds in U.S. history for women's soccer included 76,489 for the final (which was not broadcast on national television). Women's soccer began attracting more national attention after the Olympics, and Mia Hamm became the face of the sport.

==== 1997–1998 ====
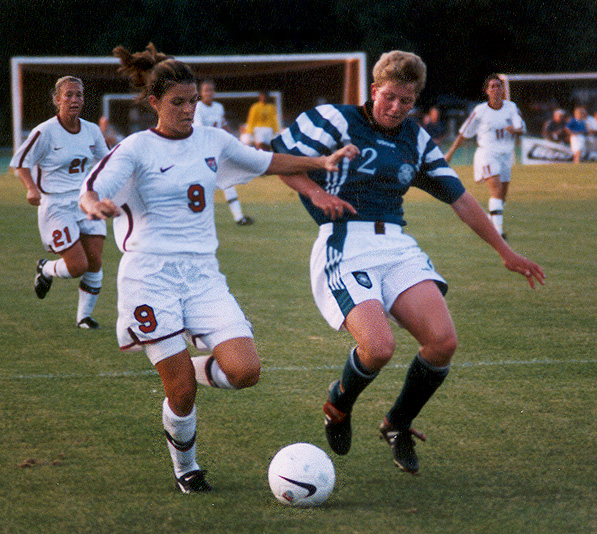
Mia Hamm (left) during a 1997 match against Germany

The U.S. women's national team played 18 games in 1997, mostly international friendlies. Their only major tournament was the May USA Women's Cup, which the U.S. again won. The team ended the season with 16 wins and two losses.

They began 1998 with the Guangzhou International Tournament in China with two wins against Sweden and Norway and a draw against China. The U.S. played in the March Algarve Cup, starting off well with two wins in the group stage before losing to Norway and finishing third. A series of friendlies followed the Algarve until July, when women's soccer was added to the Goodwill Games for the first time. Only four teams competed; the U.S. took the gold, defeating Denmark 5–0 and China 2–0. They ended the year with the USA Women's Cup, winning every match; during that tournament, Mia Hamm scored her 100th goal.

==== 1999: The Road to Pasadena ====
In preparation for the 1999 FIFA Women's World Cup, the U.S. women's national team played a nineteen-game "Road to Pasadena". They began the year with two friendlies against Portugal in January, winning both. In February, however, the team lost an exhibition match against the FIFA World Stars. They lost the Algarve Cup final to China, 2–1, the following month. The team spent the next three months playing a series of friendlies in preparation for the World Cup, and their only loss was to China in late April.

==== 1999 World Cup ====
The Women's World Cup was held in the United States for the first time in 1999. FIFA had originally planned a small, low-key event like the previous two cups. The USSF wanted this World Cup to promote soccer in the United States, calling for arger stadiums across the country, and FIFA relented.

The country's World Cup roster was filled with veterans, six having played in the 1991 and 1995 World Cups. Michelle Akers was on the original national team in 1985, Mia Hamm had just set the world scoring record, and Kristine Lilly was the world's leader in international appearances. In addition to the six players who played in the first two World Cups, six more would be playing their second World Cup and eight were appearing in a World Cup for the first time. The team included thirteen of the sixteen members of the 1996 Olympic Team.

The U.S. won all three of its group-stage matches, defeating Denmark 3–0, Nigeria 7–1, and North Korea 3–0. The opening game against Denmark attracted 78,972 fans, a world attendance record for any women's sporting event and a Giants Stadium record for a sporting event.

In the quarterfinals, the U.S. defeated Germany 3–2 in perhaps their toughest game of the tournament. They won 2–0 against Brazil in the semifinals, advancing to the final against China. The match, at the Rose Bowl in Pasadena, attracted over 90,000 fans. It was scoreless after 90 minutes and two overtime periods, resulting in a penalty-kick shootout. Briana Scurry saved Liu Yang's third shot, putting the United States ahead. Veteran Brandi Chastain scored the last shot, giving the U.S. the victory.

Following their World Cup victory in July, the U.S. took almost two months off to rest before playing a friendly against Ireland in September in Foxborough, Massachusetts. They then played Brazil in October, winning again. The U.S. again played in the USA Women's Cup, winning all their matches. Every game after the World Cup attracted large crowds, highlighted by 35,000 for the final two USA Women's Cup games. The team made a three-month, 12-city Victory Tour, playing exhibition indoor matches against a team of international stars in cities which had not seen MLS or national team games.

==== 2000 strike and Summer Olympics ====
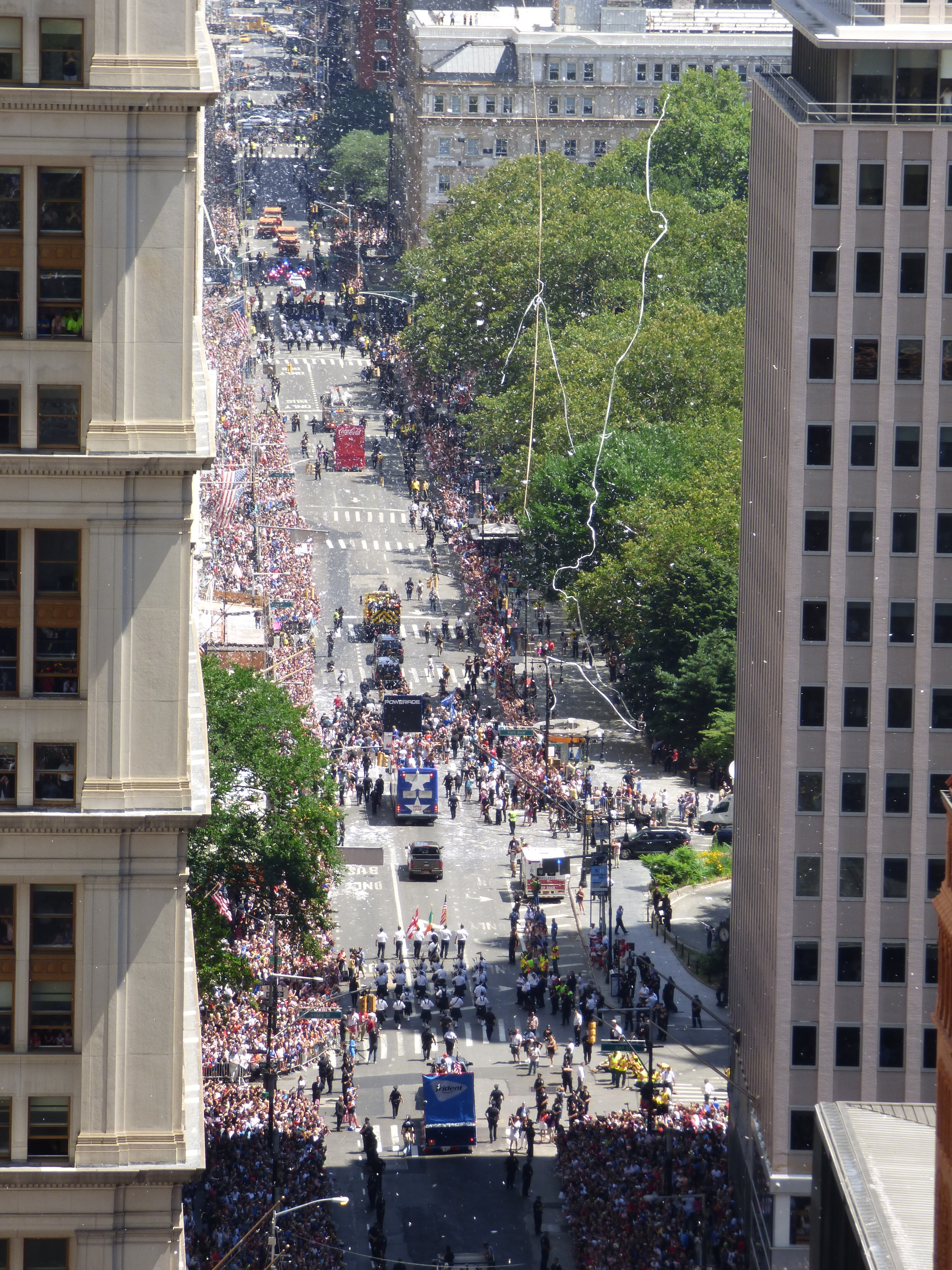
A ticker-tape parade in Manhattan celebrating the national team's 2015 World Cup victory

In December 1999, the team announced they would be sitting out the 2000 Australia Cup over a contract dispute with the United States Soccer Federation (U.S. Soccer). The federation sent a team of younger players in place of the World Cup winners. After the tournament, the younger team sided with the veterans and refused to play until a more favorable contract was signed. The dispute was resolved in late January, and U.S. Soccer increased the players' salaries to a minimum of $5,000 a month. This made the women's team salaries comparable with the men's team.

After the dispute and the Australia Cup, the team played major tournaments leading up to the Olympics. They won their first Algarve Cup in March, defeating Portugal 7–0 in the opening match. The USA Women's Cup was played in May, and the team had two shutouts to win the tournament; Kristine Lilly became the first player to earn 200 caps in international play. They lost their first match against China in the late-May Pacific Cup before recovering to win the tournament.

The national team won the inaugural Women's Gold Cup in late June, which was the CONCACAF Women's Championship. They easily won the DFB 100th Anniversary Tournament in Germany, their last major tournament before the Olympics. After a "Road to Sydney" friendly series, the team headed to Australia for the third time that year.

Having won gold in 1996, the team automatically qualified for the Olympics. They won a difficult group stage against Norway, China, and Nigeria, advancing to the final against Norway. At the end of 90 minutes, the score was tied. In overtime, U.S. defender Joy Fawcett tried to clear an incoming ball; it hit Norwegian player Dagny Mellgren in the arm, and she kicked it into the goal. The goal was allowed; Norway won the gold medal, and the U.S. took silver.

== See also ==
- American Football Association
- Soccer in Houston
- Soccer in Los Angeles
- Soccer in the New York metropolitan area
- History of professional soccer in Seattle
- History of the U.S. Open Cup
- List of American and Canadian soccer champions
- Major League Soccer
- Major Indoor Soccer League (1978–1992)
- North American Soccer League (2011–2017)
- Pasuckuakohowog, a 17th-century Native American form of football
- Soccer in the United States
- United Soccer League
- U.S. Soccer Federation
- United States soccer league system
- United States men's national soccer team
- United States women's national soccer team
- U.S. Open Cup
