= Boston game =

Early American form of football

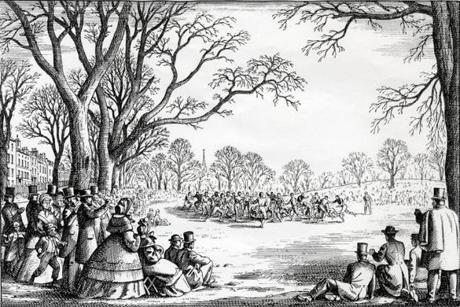
- An illustration of an Oneida Football Club game played at Boston Common in Boston, c. 1862-1865
- First played: 1862; 164 years ago in Boston

Characteristics
- Contact: Yes
- Type: Team sport Outdoor
- Equipment: Football ball
- Venue: Boston Common, Boston, Massachusetts, U.S.

Presence
- Country or region: United States
- Olympic: No
- World Championships: No
- Paralympic: No
- Obsolete: Yes

The Boston game, also known as the Boston rules, was an early code of football developed by the Oneida Football Club, formed in 1862 and considered by some historians as the first formal "football" club in the United States. Rules allowed carrying and kicking and is considered the first step to the codification of rules for association football, rugby football, or American football. After Oneida disbanded, former members established the Harvard University Football Club, which continued to play football under those rules.

The rules were also the code used in the first (of two) 1874 games between Harvard and McGill Universities.

Nevertheless, after the series vs McGill, the Harvard players were so enthusiastic about rugby football that they decided to embrace the game, leaving the Boston Game behind. The establishment of the Intercollegiate Football Association in 1876 was a further step in the transition from rugby to American football.

== History ==
=== Background and development ===
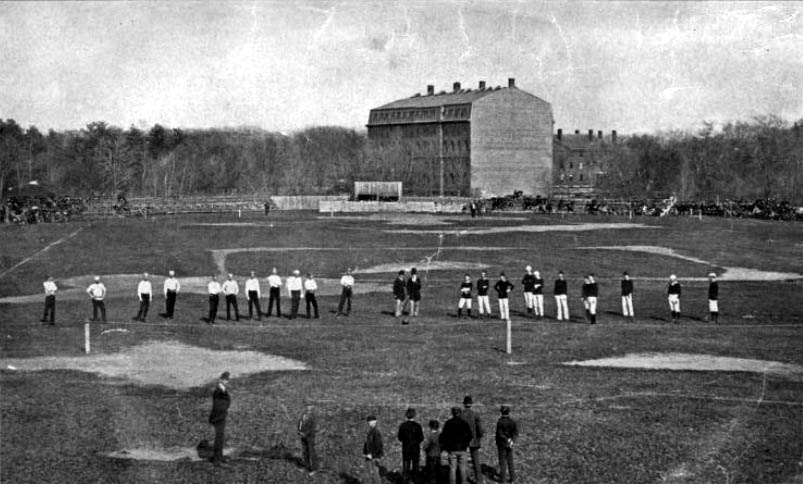
The second Harvard vs. McGill game in 1874, played under rugby football rules; the first game was played under the Boston rules.

By the early 19th century, as was the case in Great Britain, schools and universities in North America played their own local games, between sides made up of students. For example, students at Dartmouth College in Hanover, New Hampshire played a game called Old division football, a variant of the association football codes, as early as the 1820s. They remained largely "mob football" style games, with huge numbers of players attempting to advance the ball into a goal area, often by any means necessary. Rules were simple, violence and injury were common.

The violence of these mob-style games led to widespread protests and a decision to abandon them. Yale University, under pressure from the city of New Haven, banned the play of all forms of football in 1860, while Harvard University followed suit in 1861. In its place, two general types of football evolved: "kicking" games and "running" (or "carrying") games. A hybrid of the two, known as the "Boston game", was played by a group known as the Oneida Football Club. The club, considered by some historians as the first formal football club in the United States, was formed in 1862 by schoolboys who played the "Boston game" on Boston Common. They played mostly among themselves, though they organized a team of non-members to play a game in November 1863, which the Oneidas won easily. The game caught the attention of the press, and "the Boston game" continued to spread throughout the 1860s. Oneida, from 1862 to 1865, reportedly never lost a game or even gave up a single point.

The game began to return to American college campuses by the late 1860s. The universities of Yale, Princeton (then known as the College of New Jersey), Rutgers, and Brown all began playing "kicking" games during this time. In 1867, Princeton used rules based on those of the English Football Association, Moreover, Princeton and Rutgers played the first collegiate match in 1869 with rules that resembled more association than any other form of "football".

Like Princeton, most of the surrounding universities preferred to play association football, so Harvard could not find an opponent, as they refused to play that style of game. Nevertheless, that situation changed in 1873 when the Harvard team received an invitation from Canadian McGill University Football Club. The McGill team was then in a similar situation as Harvard, as they sought some team with which to play rugby football and no other club wanted to play that game. Harvard boys agreed to a rugby match with McGill under the condition the Canadians played the Boston Game. As McGill accepted, a two-game series was scheduled for May 1874 in Boston. The team captains sent letters detailing their respective game's rules and it was agreed that the first game would be played under Boston rules and the second under rugby rules.

The first game, attended by nearly 500 spectators, mostly students, showed the kicking of a round ball as the most prominent feature of the "Boston Game". The Canadians were easily defeated by a Harvard squad familiarised with the Boston rules in contrast to the lack of experience of McGill players. During the second game under the rugby rules, the Harvard players easily adapted to the less restrictive rules of the game, such as the unlimited running and passing the ball or the more aggressive and constant tackling. Within a few years, Harvard had both adopted McGill's rules and persuaded other U.S. university teams to do the same. On June 4, 1875, Harvard played another rugby match against Tufts University (lost 1–0), and then Yale on November 13. That game caused Yale to drop association football in favor of rugby.

On November 23, 1876, representatives from Harvard, Yale, Princeton, and Columbia met at the Massasoit Convention in Springfield, Massachusetts, agreeing to adopt most of the Rugby Football Union rules, with some variations, so the "Intercollegiate Football Association" was established. Many college teams followed them, which led to a long decline of popularity of association football in North America.

=== Demise and birth of American football ===
In 1880, Yale coach Walter Camp, who had become a fixture at the Massasoit House conventions where the rules were debated and changed, devised a number of major innovations. Camp's two most important rule changes that diverged the American game from rugby were replacing the scrummage with the line of scrimmage and the establishment of the down-and-distance rules.

The adoption of Camp's ideas derived in the sport currently known as American football, marking the end of the rugby-style football played until then. Likewise the Boston Game was a milestone in the history of football in the United States and an evolution chain from association to American football.

== Rules ==
1874 rules of the Boston Game were as follows:

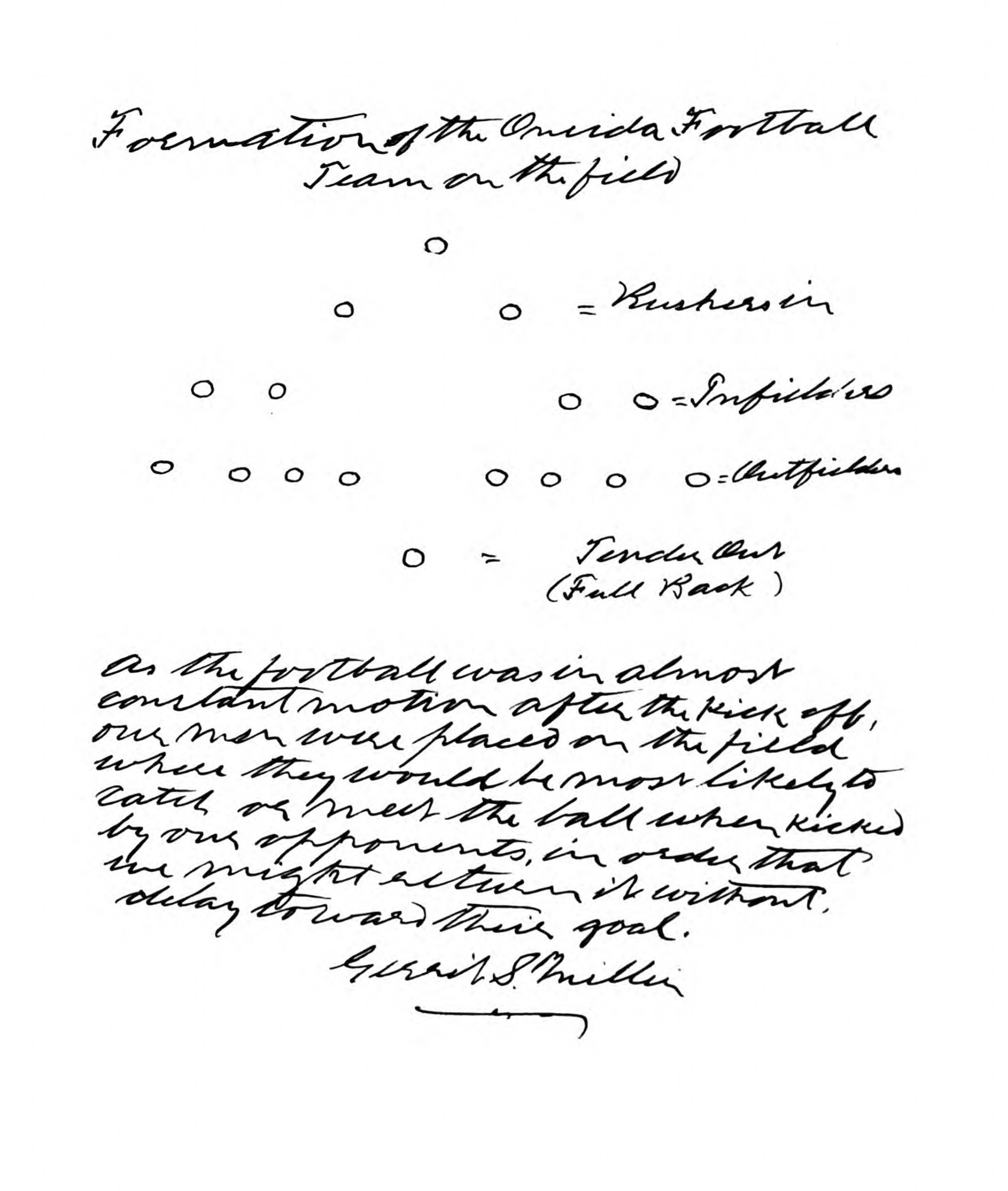
An Oneida FC formation, which showed 16 players on field

1. The number of players upon each side shall not be less than ten nor more than fifteen.
2. The grounds shall not be less than 350 feet nor more than 450 feet in length; and not less than 255 nor more than 325 feet in width.
3. There shall be two end boundaries and two side boundaries.
4. The two end boundaries shall form the goals. To win a game, the ball must strike the ground beyond either goal, passing over it on the fly, but no game can be won on a fair kick.
5. When the ball passes over either side boundary it shall be considered dead, and the player first holding it shall be entitled to a fair kick, and shall carry the ball within bounds at right angles to the boundary line at the spot where it first struck.
6. When the ball passes over either goal in any manner other than to win a game, it shall be considered dead, as in Rule 5, and may be placed anywhere within a line drawn parallel to the goal, and 10 feet distant from it.
7. The winner of the toss shall have either the warning kick or the choice of goals. The warning kick shall be taken from a point half-way between the two goals.
8. Any player is allowed to catch or pick up the ball. No player is allowed to run with the ball or to baby the ball unless pursued by an opponent, and then only while so pursued.
9. No player is allowed to throw or pass the ball to another player unless pursued by an opponent.
10. No lurking, striking, hacking, tripping, nor butting among the players is allowed.
11. Any player when on the adversary's side of the ball must either walk toward the ball, or must walk toward his own goal in a line at right angles with that goal. Any player not complying with this law shall be considered as lurking, and shall not be allowed to touch the ball until he has reached a point on his own side of the ball.
12. A match shall consist of five games. The side winning 3 games out of 5 shall be the winner of the match.
13. Each side shall appoint an umpire who shall select in turn a referee.
14. It shall be the duty of the umpires to settle all disputes, see that the rules of the game are complied with, name the victors in all matches, and perform in short all the ordinary duties of an umpire.
