= Harvey Otis Young =

American painter and prospector (1940–1901)

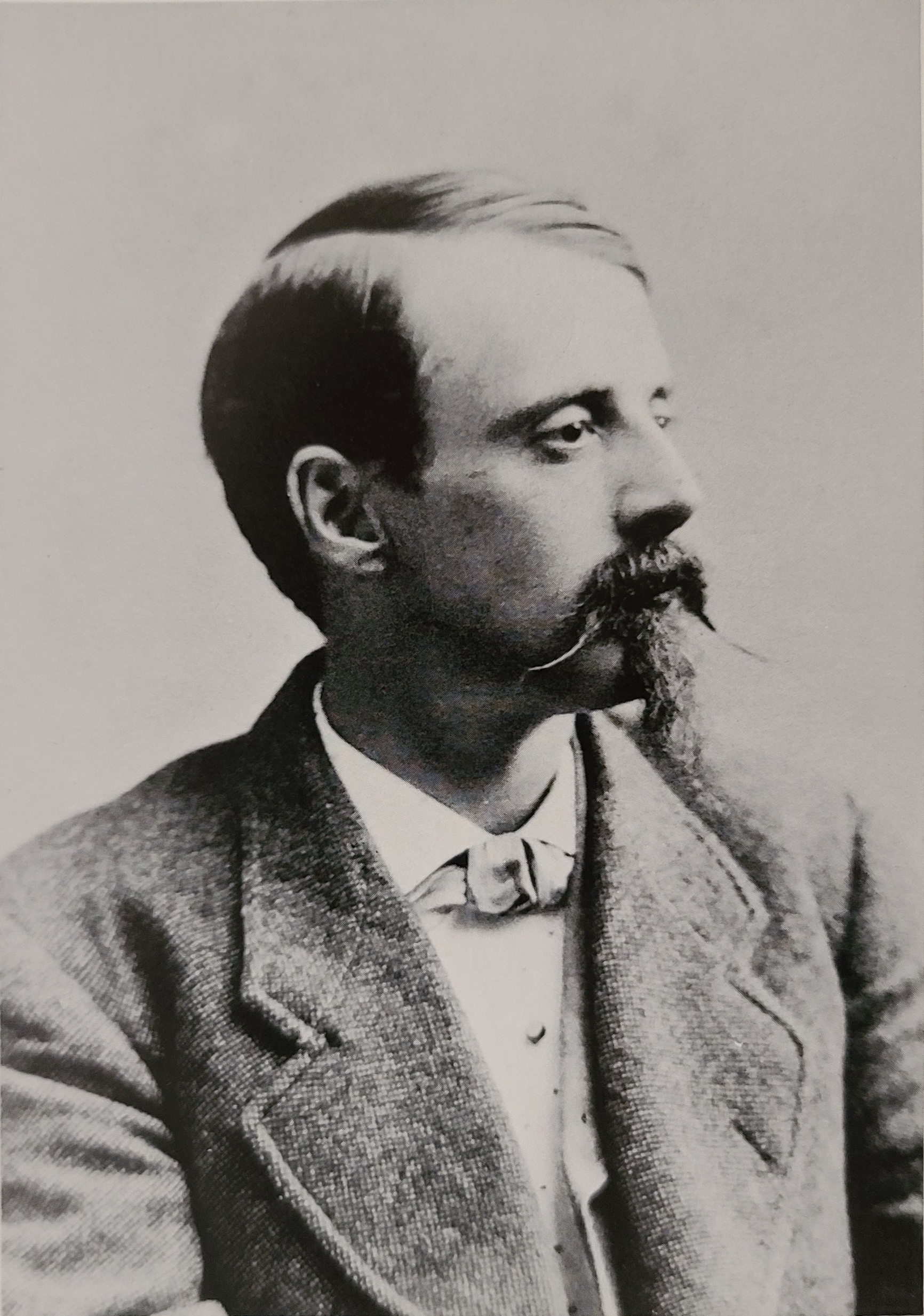
- Young in 1871
- Born: November 23, 1840; Lyndon, Vermont, U.S.
- Died: May 13, 1901 (aged 60); Colorado Springs, Colorado, U.S.

Harvey Otis Young (November 23, 1840 – May 13, 1901) was an American painter and prospector. He was a prominent figure in the Denver art scene and a founding member of the Artists' Club of Denver, which eventually became the Denver Art Museum in 1923.

== Early life and gold mining ==
Harvey Otis Young was born on November 23, 1840, in Lyndon, Vermont, the younger of two sons of Wealthy Anne and Otis Jarvis Young. His father died the following year and his mother left her sons with their aunt Aurilla Young and their grandfather David Young. Their mother had moved to Somerville, Massachusetts, to work at a nursing home while her sons stayed in Lyndon until their grandfather's death in 1843. Very little is known of his life between 1844 and 1857. Young is believed to have grown up in St. Johnsbury and can be found in the 1850 census records for Caledonia County as a resident of a farm belonging to a George Aldrich. He attended St. Johnsbury Academy and is said to have worked as ornamental painter at Fairbanks Scale Company while his biographer Patricia Trenton doubts this work involved actual artistic duties.

Young left Vermont in 1857 and may have possibly studied art in Worcester, Massachusetts before moving to New York City. In 1859, Young boarded a steamer to California via the Panama Canal in search of gold in the Sierra Nevada mountain range. He arrived on the West Coast in 1860 and set out for the next six years to mine for gold along the Salmon River like thousands of other placer miners who rushed to the region before surface mining was no longer profitable in the mid-1860s.

== Art career ==
Young moved to San Francisco in 1866 and was initially employed as decorator of horse-drawn carriages. In January of the next year, he opened a studio to become a fine artist. He joined the San Francisco Artists' Union in 1868 and exhibited Vernal Fall at the 6th Mechanics' Institute in Fair the same year. In October of the following year, the Snow & Roos Gallery exhibited a collection of his work. In 1870, Young returned to the East Coast on his way to Europe through New York City.

In 1873, he returned to the Sierra Nevada to sketch and made his way thru Utah, Colorado, and New Mexico. The same year, Morris Schwab's gallery exhibited Young's painting Echo Lake, the name by which several places in California, Colorado, and Utah are known. Several other paintings are dated to the same year, including Great Blue Canyon, Sierra Nevada, and Rocky Mountain Scene, which Trenton wrote "suggest the limitless expanse and remoteness of the frontier region".

In 1879, Young settled briefly in Manitou Springs, Colorado. In moving West again, he had two goals: sketch in preparation for commissioned paintings of the West and participate in mining opportunities. Young had a limited artistic output during the 1880s and focused on mining. There were occasional press reports of his sketches of Colorado and New Mexico but few paintings from his period as a transient miner. His work was included in the first exhibition of the Denver's Paint and Clay Club and Young began to be praised for his work's "fidelity to nature and for its spiritual content". He began to feature prominently in Denver's art scene and, in 1893, joined the executive committee of the Artists' Club of Denver as well as serving a juror for the organization's exhibitions in 1894 and 1895. The Artists' Club eventually became the Denver Art Museum in 1923.

Young's work is held in the collections of the Denver Art Museum, the Colorado Springs Fine Arts Center at Colorado College, and the Kirkland Museum of Fine & Decorative Art.

== Personal life and death ==
Young married Josephine Bowyer in 1870 while living in New York City. They had a son, George Bowyer Young. (Note: His son, George B. Young, may have been responsible for the inclusion of the middle initial B. in his father's obituary in the Denver Republican on May 15, 1901. The appearance of the middle initial O. in his signature on early works and confirmation from his grandchildren attest to his middle name being Otis.) Their daughter Gladys Young was born in Switzerland in 1887. For most of the last two decades of his life, Young lived in Colorado. Besides occasionally traveling with him through Europe, his family briefly resided in Switzerland and Washington, DC, and established a family home in Manitou Springs in 1885 and in Colorado Springs in 1899.

Young died on May 13, 1901, in Colorado Springs. He had recently returned from a trip to Chicago, where he had become ill. He returned to Colorado Springs to recover but suffered a sudden relapse a week later. His cause of death was recorded as "congestion of the lungs". The funeral a few days later was held at his residence and presided over by William F. Slocum, President of Colorado College.

== Sources ==
- Bantel, Linda; Burke, Doreen Bolger; Perlman, Meg; Walsh, Amy L. (1965). Luhrs, Kathleen; Mott, Jacolyn A. (eds.). American Paintings in the Metropolitan Museum of Art. Vol. 2. Metropolitan Museum of Art. pp. 547–549. ISBN 978-0-87099-439-5.
- Davis, Jefferson (May 12, 2015). The Papers of Jefferson Davis: 1880–1889. LSU Press. ISBN 978-0-8071-5910-1.
- Lekisch, Barbara (2003). Embracing Scenes about Lakes Tahoe & Donner: Painters, Illustrators & Sketch Artists 1855–1915. Great West Books. ISBN 978-0-944220-14-6.
- Trenton, Patricia (1975). Harvey Otis Young: The Lost Genius 1840–1901. Denver Art Museum. ISBN 978-0-914738-09-1.
