= William F. Slocum =

American clergyman and educator (1851–1934)

William F. Slocum Jr.
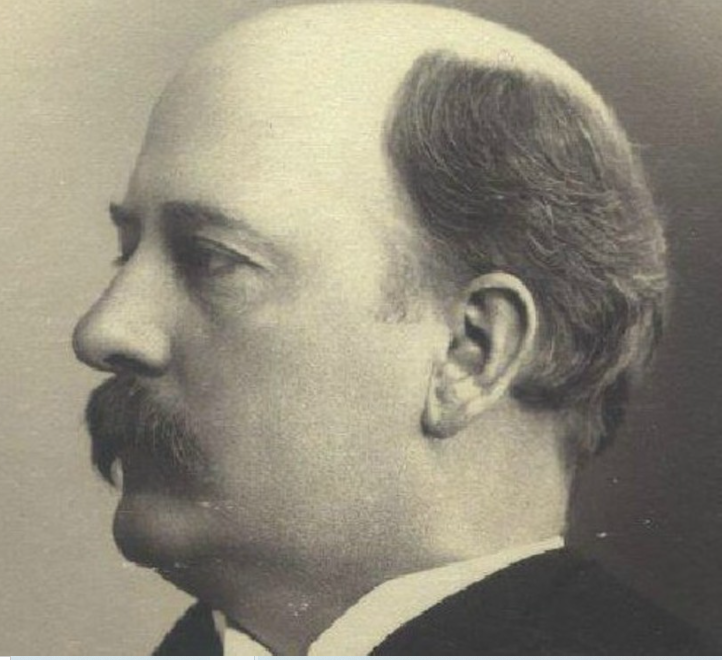
- Born: July 29, 1851; Grafton, Massachusetts
- Died: 1934 (aged 82–83)
- Education: Amherst College, 1874; Andover Theological Seminary, 1878
- Known for: President of Colorado College, sexual assault
- Spouse(s): Mary Goodale Montgomery, m. 1880

William Frederick Slocum Jr. (1851 – 1934) was an American educator. In 1917 he was forced to retire as President of Colorado College after an investigation confirmed the accusations of multiple women that he had sexually harassed and sexually assaulted them.

== Biography ==
He was the son of William F. Slocum, a Boston lawyer, and Margaret Tinker. He graduated from Amherst College in 1874. In 1874 and 1875, he was a newspaper correspondent in England and Germany. By 1876, he was at Andover Theological Seminary, where he graduated in 1878. He held Congregational pastorates at Amesbury, Massachusetts (1878–83), where in 1880 he married Mary Goodale Montgomery, and in Baltimore, Maryland (1883–88). He then became president of Colorado College.

In 1917 he was forced to retire after an investigation confirmed the accusations of multiple women that he had sexually harassed and sexually assaulted them.

After these events, Slocum moved to Newton Center, Massachusetts. He lectured and wrote on educational and sociological subjects.

=== Early life ===
William Frederick Slocum grew up in Grafton, Massachusetts, where his family went to the Congregational Church. He attended Amherst College in Amherst, Massachusetts. His years at Amherst were important, because he spent much of his professional life striving to make Colorado College a liberal arts college in the mode of Amherst College. He prepared for the ministry at Andover Theological Seminary in Andover, Massachusetts, and became the pastor of the Congregational Church in Amesbury, Massachusetts, a classic New England mill town. Along with his new wife, Mary Goodale Montgomery, Slocum ministered to the social and economic needs as well as the religious needs of his Amesbury parishioners.

In 1883 William F. Slocum became pastor of the First Congregational Church in Baltimore, Maryland. He became acquainted with Daniel Coit Gilman, the famous president of Johns Hopkins University in Baltimore. Slocum joined with Gilman and other civic leaders in organizing the Associated Charities of Baltimore.

While in Baltimore, Slocum received a visit from Professor George N. Marden of Colorado College, who was on a fund-raising trip on the East Coast. Marden told Slocum of Colorado College in far-off Colorado Springs, Colorado, and of its desperate need for a new president. William Slocum accepted the job, and he and Mary Slocum went west to see if they could save the foundering institution. "At the age of 37 he cast his lot with [Colorado] College, and from that time forth, for almost a third of a century, the story of William Frederick Slocum and the story of Colorado College are one story."

=== At Colorado College ===
When he arrived in the fall of 1888, William Slocum found Colorado College in dire straits. There was only one building - Cutler Hall - and fewer than 50 students. There were only four faculty members, three men and one woman.

Slocum began his presidential tenure by reforming the calendar. Three unequal terms were replaced with the standard two-semester calendar found at most colleges and universities. Slocum strongly emphasized the religious side of education, giving Friday morning chapel sermons called "Ethicals." He built a central heating plant to keep students warm in the residence halls. He hired Colorado College's first administrator, Ruth Loomis, to be the Dean of Women. A graduate of Vassar College in Poughkeepsie, New York, Dean Loomis was said to "bring to a small western college the sophistication, gentility, and sense of proper behavior typified by an eastern college for women."

As the student body grew in size under Slocum's leadership, he began hiring additional faculty. "The faculty that President Slocum did succeed in bringing to Colorado College gave to the institution a name among the best colleges and universities in the land."

President Slocum also participated actively in community life in Colorado Springs. When gold miners in the nearby community of Cripple Creek went on strike for an eight-hour day, Slocum courageously walked through the picket lines in an effort to get the striking miners to peacefully settle their differences with the mine owners. The strike was settled, and the miners got both their goals - an eight-hour day and a $3 daily wage. Later, when a major fire roared through Cripple Creek, Slocum mobilized the students of Colorado College to canvas nearby residential areas for clothing, food, and firewood to help the burned out gold miners and their families.

In 1893 President Slocum and Colorado College hosted the Colorado Summer School of Science, Philosophy, and Languages. One of the teachers in the summer school was Katherine Lee Bates, a professor of English at Wellesley College in Massachusetts. While teaching at Colorado College, she took a two-day wagon trip to the top of Pike's Peak, a high Rocky Mountain to the west of Colorado Springs. Bates was so inspired by the view of the mountains and the plains from atop Pike's Peak that she wrote a poem entitled "America The Beautiful." Her words were set to an existing musical piece. The patriotic song that was created became a national favorite.

Slocum was a prodigious fundraiser on behalf of Colorado College. In 1896 he successfully raised $150,000, a considerable sum for that time. In the ensuing celebration, the men students pulled Slocum around the campus and downtown Colorado Springs in a buggy. An amused onlooker noted: "The center of interest was President Slocum, trying not to look too unhappy, seated in a high run-a-bout, drawn by students who were in cap and gown, and clasping to him a large money bag (made...of one of Mrs. Slocum's soft pillows) with $150,000 on it in large figures." One of the contributors said he gave money to Colorado College because "he liked that young man who was doing things out there in Colorado."

Slocum gained a national reputation as the successful leader of a western small liberal arts college. He turned down the presidencies of Oberlin College and the University of Illinois in order to complete his work at Colorado College. He received honorary degrees from Amherst College (his alma mater), Harvard University, and five other institutions of higher learning. He continued his charitable activities in the larger community by helping to organize the Colorado State Board of Charities and serving on the Colorado State Board of Pardons. In 1913, upon Slocum's 25th year as Colorado College president, there was a five-day celebration in his honor. A painting of him in his academic robes was commissioned and hung in the grand staircase of Palmer Hall.

== Controversy and resignation ==
In 1916, a number of women in the college community charged that Slocum had sexually assaulted them. An investigation confirmed the accusations of multiple women that he had sexually harassed and sexually assaulted them. "Hundreds of women" including students, staff, faculty and faculty wives accused him orally, and 22 gave written affidavits. Nine women allowed a local historian, James Hutchison Kerr, to copy their statements for his records.

The college Board of Trustees asked Slocum to resign, and he did so as of graduation in June 1917. "In reviewing these more personal criticisms of the president, the trustees...felt that their general discussion in the community...could not be ignored." Soon afterward, the Board of Trustees asked for the resignation of Edward Parsons, the dean who had brought forward the accusations. He refused, and was dismissed. In protest, 23 faculty and staff left the college. After the intervention of the American Association of University Professors, Parsons was invited to return, but did not.

William and Mary Slocum moved to the Boston-area town of Newton, Massachusetts. William Slocum returned briefly to Colorado Springs in 1929 to give the principal address at the dedication of General William F. Palmer's statue (on horseback) in downtown Colorado Springs. Mary Slocum died in 1933, and William Slocum died in 1934.

In 2018, in light of renewed attention to Slocum's sexual misconduct on the centennial of his departure, Colorado College removed his name from two buildings, took down his portrait, and rescinded an honorary doctorate that it had given him at his resignation.

== Buildings ==
One of Slocum's greatest contributions to Colorado College was the construction of ten major academic and residential buildings. Slocum took the lead in raising the money to build the new buildings as well as seeing to the construction details. The ten buildings were:

- Hagerman Hall (1889) - A men's dormitory. Named for James J. Hagerman, a builder/owner of the local Colorado Midland railroad. Romanesque architecture built of peach pink blow sandstone. Torn down in the 1950s.
- Montgomery Hall (1891) - A women's dormitory modeled after the "cottage" system at Smith College in Northampton, Massachusetts. Included a living room, small infirmary, and a kitchen and pantry. Built of Castle Rock Lava, a grey stone.
- Coburn Library (1892) - Named for Nathan Parker Coburn, a childhood friend of Slocum, who gave the money. Romanesque architecture built of peach pink blow sandstone, with large arched windows. Torn down in the 1960s.
- Wolcott (Astronomical) Observatory (1894) - Named for Henry R. Wolcott, of Denver, who gave the money and provided the telescope. Included a lecture hall, photographic laboratory, and a faculty office. Torn down in the late 1960s.
- Ticknor Hall (1898) - A second women's dormitory. Named for Anna Ticknor, of Boston, Massachusetts, a friend of the anonymous donor. Built of Ute Pass Green Stone, which had a brownish color. Included a club-recreation room and a room for the women students to store their bicycles, a popular mode of personal transportation at the time.
- Perkins Hall (1898) - A music and fine arts building. President Slocum had recently added Music and Fine Arts to the curriculum. Named for Willard B. Perkins, an architect who moved to Colorado Springs for his health and became well known in the region. Romanesque architecture build of pink peach blow sandstone. Included a 600-seat assembly hall with a pipe organ. Torn down in the 1960s.
- Palmer Hall (1903) - A science building with laboratories, lecture halls, and a large science museum. Named for William J. Palmer, who founded Colorado Springs and gave the land for the college campus. Romanesque architecture built of pink peach blow sandstone. On instructions from President Slocum, the building was located in such a way it prevented the construction of a streetcar line through the center of the campus.
- McGregor Hall (1904) - A third dormitory for women. Named in honor of the family of Marion McGregor Noyes, who taught Latin and Philosophy at Colorado College. Built of Greenlee sandstone, which was red in color.
- Bemis Hall (1908) - A fourth dormitory for women. Its completion created an approximate "Women's Quadrangle" of four dorms - Montgomery, Ticknor, McGregor, and Bemis halls. Named for Judson M. Bemis, a leading manufacturer of paper and cloth bags. Constructed of grey stone in an Old English architectural style. Included a large lounge area used for major campus social events.
- Cossitt Hall (1913) - An athletic and social center for male students. Named for Frederick H. Cossitt, the father of the donor, Mrs. A. D. Juilliard, who was a relative of President Slocum. Built of grey stone matching Bemis Hall. Included a gymnasium with a full-size basketball court, a men's dining room, and a large lounge area.

For the next four decades, these buildings were the physical presence of Colorado College. Only one new major building, Shove Chapel, was constructed between the completion of Cossitt Hall in 1913 and the construction of Slocum Hall (a new men's dormitory) in 1954. Four of Slocum's ten major buildings had been dismantled by the early 21st century (Hagerman Hall, Coburn Library, Perkins Hall, and Wollcott Observatory).

== Publications ==
- The present status and probable future of the college in the West by William Frederick Slocum
- Addresses at the annual meeting of the New West Education Commission by Frank W Gunsaulus
- The nation's guarantee of personal rights by William Frederick Slocum
- Addresses at the commencement exercises of Colorado College, June 1913
- Mormonism and Jesuitism : addresses at the annual meeting of the New West Education Commission, held October 14, 1890, in the First Congregational Church, Chicago
- Constitutional basis of citizenship in the United States; commencement address, May 26, 1911 by William Frederick Slocum
- Annual address before the twenty-eighth continental congress of the National Society of the Daughters of the American Revolution by William Frederick Slocum
- Best use of a large bequest in the erection of a sanatorium for the benefit of consumptives by W. F. Slocum
- Present Status and Probable Future of the College in the West by Colorado College
- Nation's Guarantee of Personal Rights by Colorado College
