= Bemis Hall =

Bemis Hall may refer to:

- Bemis Hall (Colorado Springs, Colorado), part of Colorado College and on the National Register of Historic Places
- Bemis Hall (Lincoln, Massachusetts)
