= Richthofen (disambiguation) =

Richthofen most commonly refers to Manfred von Richthofen (1892–1918), a fighter pilot with the German Air Force during World War I.

Richthofen may also refer to:

== Places ==
- Mount Richthofen, a summit in the Rocky Mountains in Colorado
- Richthofen Castle, a mansion in Denver, Colorado
- Richthofen Pass, a mountain pass in Graham Land, Antarctica
- Richthofen Range, former name of the Qilian Mountains, China

== Other uses ==
- Richthofen (surname)
- Richthofen (film), a 1927 German silent war film directed by Desider Kertesz and Peter Joseph
