= Richthofen (surname) =

Richthofen is a German surname. Notable people with the name include:

- Bolko von Richthofen (1899–1983), German archaeologist
- Emil von Richthofen (1810–1895), Prussian baron and diplomat
- Ferdinand von Richthofen (1833–1905), German traveller, geographer, and scientist
- Hermann von Richthofen (1933–2021), German diplomat
- Lothar von Richthofen (1894–1922), German First World War fighter ace
- Manfred von Richthofen (1892–1918), German Air Force fighter pilot during World War I
- Oswald von Richthofen (1847–1906), German diplomat and politician
- Wolfram Freiherr von Richthofen (1895–1945), German military officer and aviator
- Else von Richthofen (1874–1973), German social scientist
- The Richthofen family, a prominent German aristocratic family
- Suzane von Richthofen (born 1983), Brazilian murderer

== Fictional characters ==
- Molly von Richthofen, a character in The Punisher comic books
- Edward Richthofen, a character in the Call of Duty zombies franchise

== See also ==
- Richthofen (disambiguation)
