= Maurice B. Biscoe =

American architect (1871–1953)

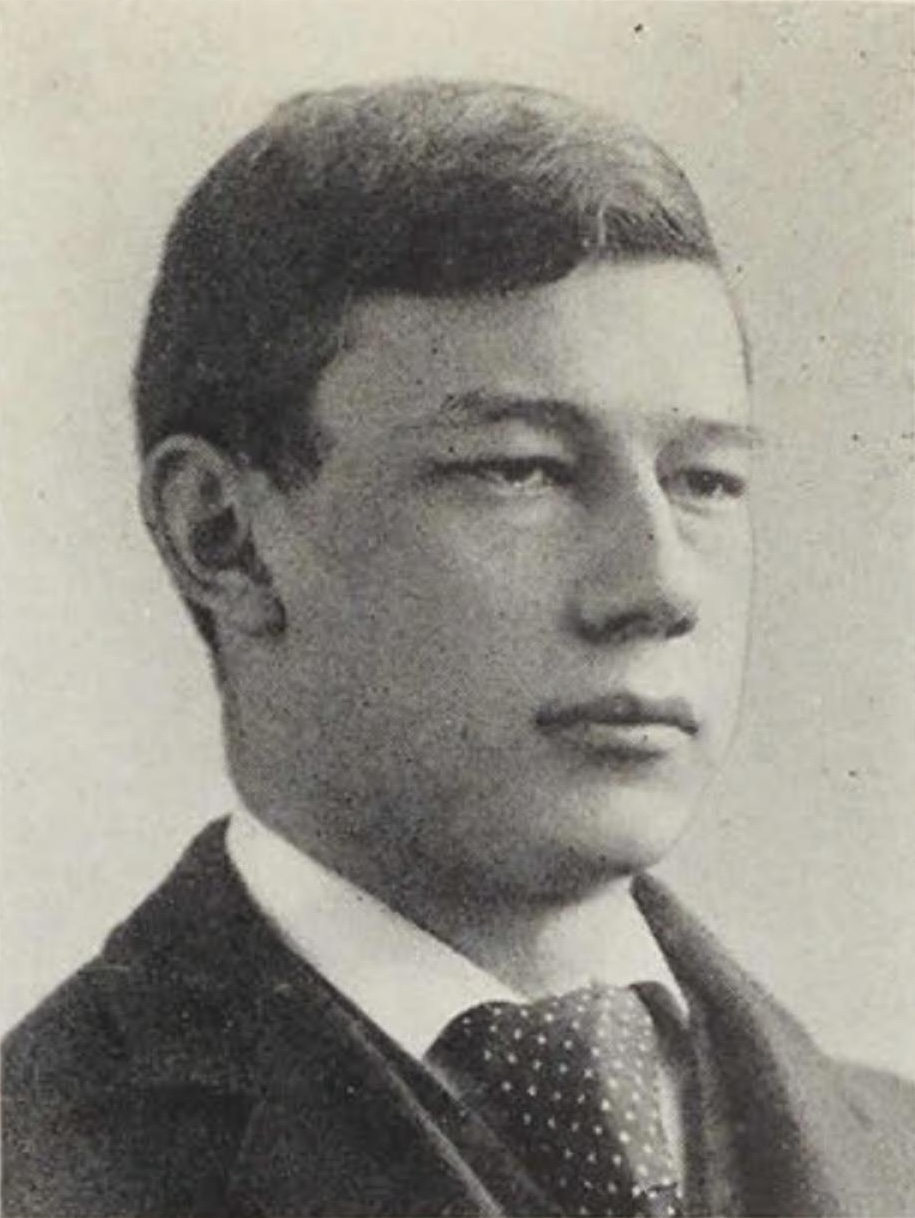
- Biscoe as a young man, c. 1893
- Born: July 19, 1871; Westborough, Massachusetts, United States
- Died: December 29, 1953 (aged 82); Newton, Massachusetts, United States
- Occupation: Architect

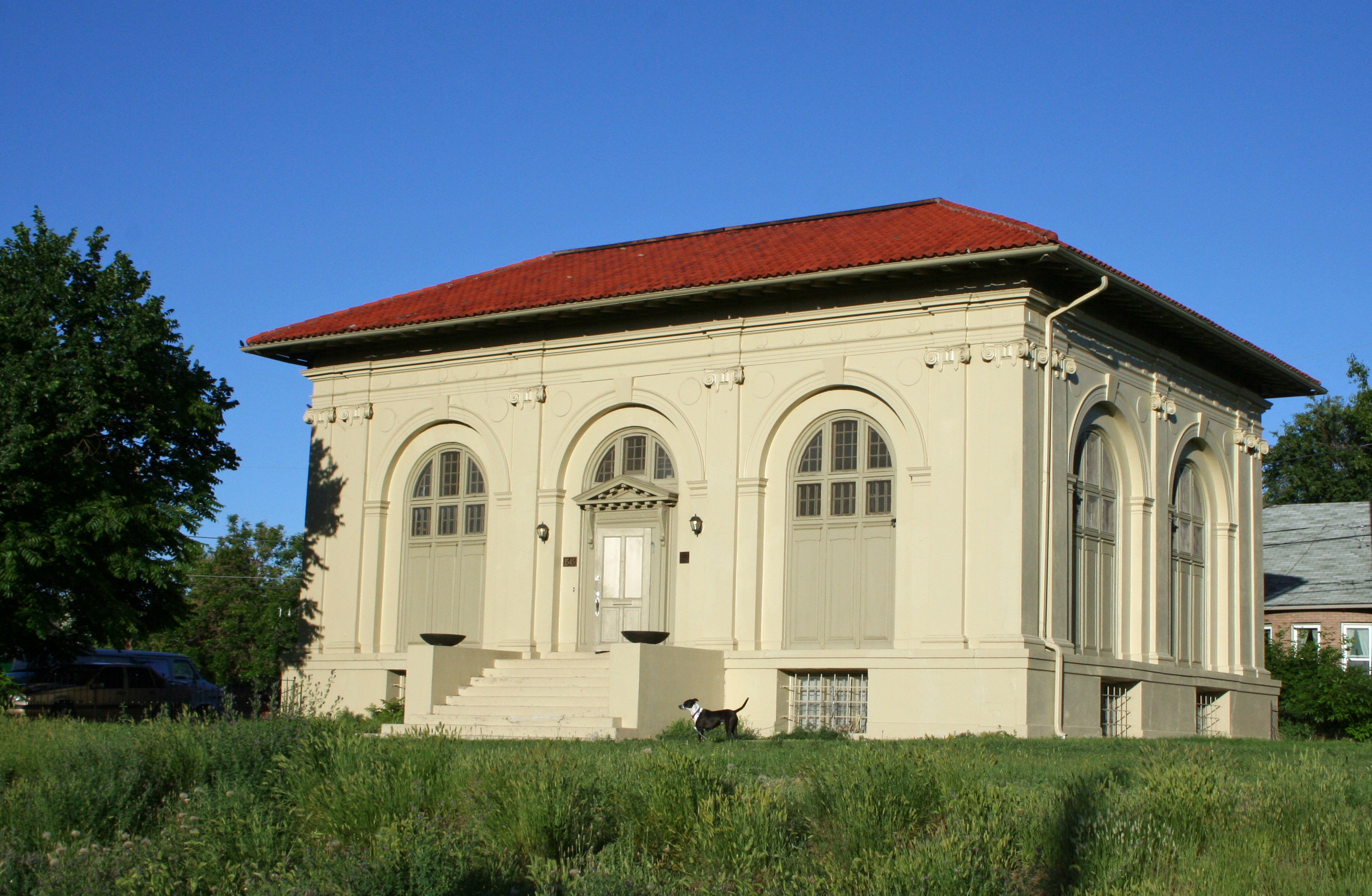
The former Dickinson Branch Library in Denver, designed by Biscoe in the Italian Renaissance Revival style and completed in 1914.

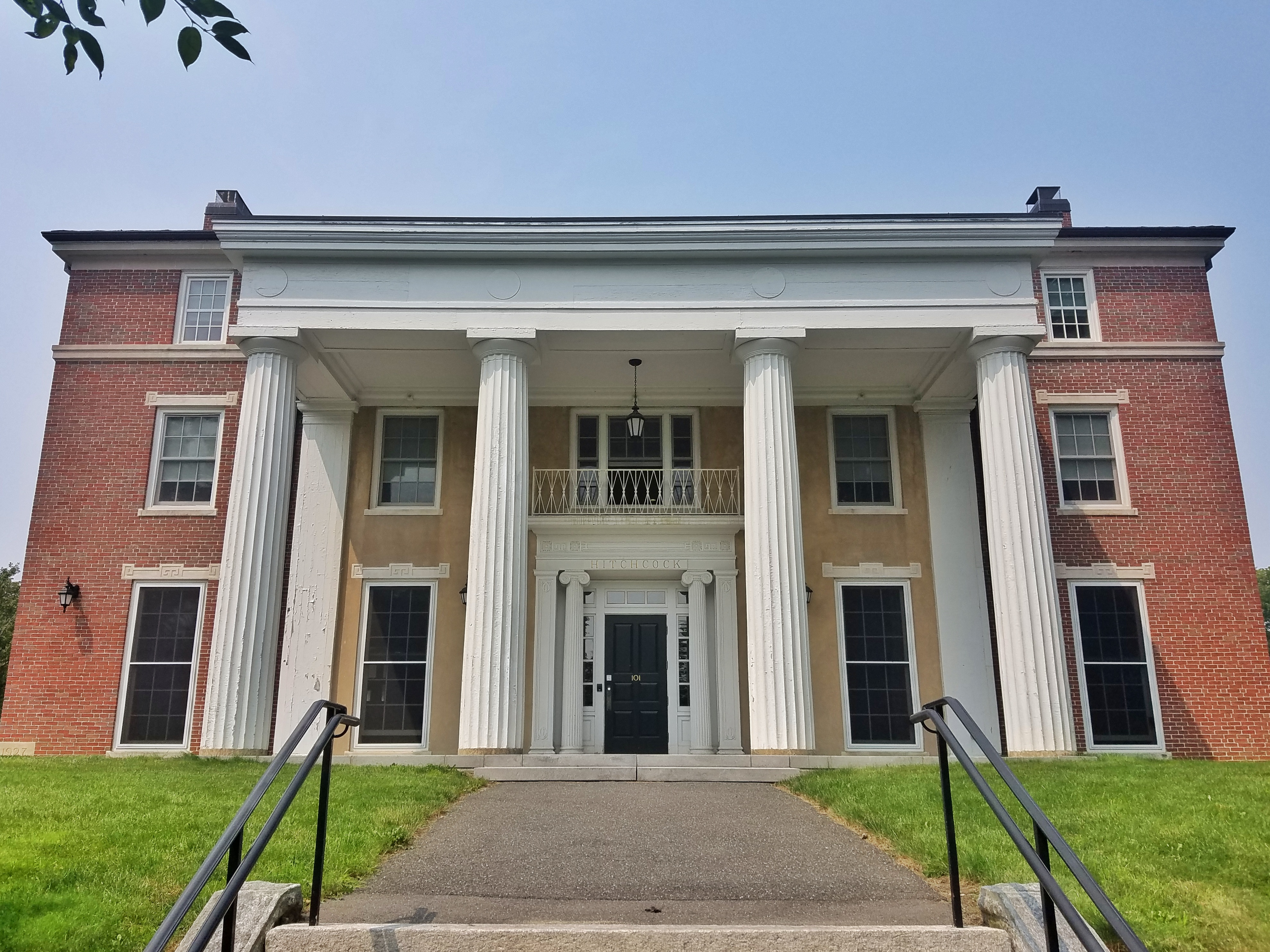
Hitchcock Residence Hall, formerly an Alpha Delta Phi fraternity house, of Amherst College, designed by Biscoe in the Greek Revival style and completed in 1929.

Maurice B. Biscoe (July 19, 1871 – December 29, 1953) was an American architect. He spent his early and mature career in Boston, and the intervening years in Denver. He spent most of his career with the Boston architectural firm of Andrews, Jones, Biscoe & Whitmore.

== Life and career ==
Maurice Bigelow Biscoe was born July 19, 1871, in Westborough, Massachusetts, to Arthur G. Biscoe and Helen Biscoe, née Bigelow. He was educated at the Massachusetts Institute of Technology, graduating in 1893. After a year of postgraduate work he joined the office of H. Langford Warren. In 1898, after two years with Warren and two with Peabody & Stearns, he formed the firm of Smith & Biscoe with F. Patterson Smith. In 1900 they merged their practice with Warren's, forming Warren, Smith & Biscoe.

In 1906 he left Boston for Denver, where he established himself as the representative of Gordon, Tracy & Swartwout of New York. He would be their superintendent for the Cathedral of St. John in the Wilderness (1911) and the Byron White United States Courthouse (1916) and independently was architect for Bemis Hall (1908) of Colorado College. In 1907 he formed the partnership of Biscoe & Hewitt with Henry Harwood Hewitt (1874 – 1926). Their work included the Wood–Morris–Bonfils House (1909), an enlargement of Richthofen Castle (1910) and the campus of the former Clayton School for Boys (1911).

In 1913 Hewitt moved to Los Angeles and Biscoe continued independently. His independent work included Frederick H. Cossitt Memorial Hall (1914) of Colorado College and the former Dickinson Branch Library (1914).

In 1918 Biscoe returned to Boston, where he joined the Housing Company as a staff architect and planner. The Housing Company, led by president Albert Farwell Bemis, developed housing in the manner of the public United States Housing Corporation. He returned to independent practice in 1921, dividing his time between Boston and Denver. In Denver he designed the now-demolished University of Colorado School of Medicine (1924) with local architects Fisher & Fisher. After his Denver work was completed he joined the established Boston firm of Andrews, Rantoul & Jones to form Andrews, Jones, Biscoe & Whitmore. His partners were Robert Day Andrews, Howland Jones and John Whitmore.

After Andrews' death in 1928 Jones, chief designer, became senior partner. Biscoe was the junior design partner. His works for the firm included: Hitchcock Residence Hall (1929) of Amherst College, The Lincoln-Eliot Elementary School (1939) in Newton, the South Boston Boys Club (1940), the Newton Cemetery chapel (1941), the now-demolished Salvation Army Building (1950) and the Memorial Spaulding Elementary School (1954) in Newton. He was also responsible for the firm's hospital projects, building on his Colorado experience. The firm's Cousens Gymnasium (1932) at Tufts University was part of the architecture event in the art competition at the 1932 Summer Olympics.

A number of his works, alone and with others, are listed on the United States National Register of Historic Places.

== Affiliations ==
He was a member of the American Institute of Architects (AIA) and the Boston Society of Architects and served as president of the Colorado chapter of the AIA for two years.

== Personal life and death ==
Biscoe was married in 1906 to Agnes Slocum. They had five children: three sons and two daughters. He died December 29, 1953, at home in Newton, Massachusetts.
