= Armando Montano =

Armando Montano may refer to:

- Armando Montaño (1989–2012), American journalist
- Armando Montano (politician) (1928–2007), American politician in the New York State Assembly
