= Armando Montaño =

American journalist

- Born: December 2, 1989; Massachusetts
- Died: June 30, 2012 (aged 22); Mexico City, Mexico
- Body discovered: In an apartment elevator shaft near where he was living
- Other name: "Mando"
- Education: Palmer High School and Grinnell College
- Alma mater: Grinnell College
- Employer: Associated Press
- Parent(s): Mario Montaño & Diane Alters
- Awards: Annual Armando Montaño Scholarships; Mondo Montaño's Scarlet & Black Fund

Armando Alters Montaño (December 2, 1989 – June 30, 2012), was an American journalist. After having just graduated with a bachelor's degree from Grinnell College, Montaño was found dead at age 22 while working as a news intern for the Associated Press in Mexico City, Mexico.

One of Montaño's last stories was about a violent stand-off at the Mexico City International Airport between Mexican federal police and corrupt officers. He was not on assignment when he died. The circumstances of his death led to widespread media coverage.

At least two awards have been established in his name.

== Background ==
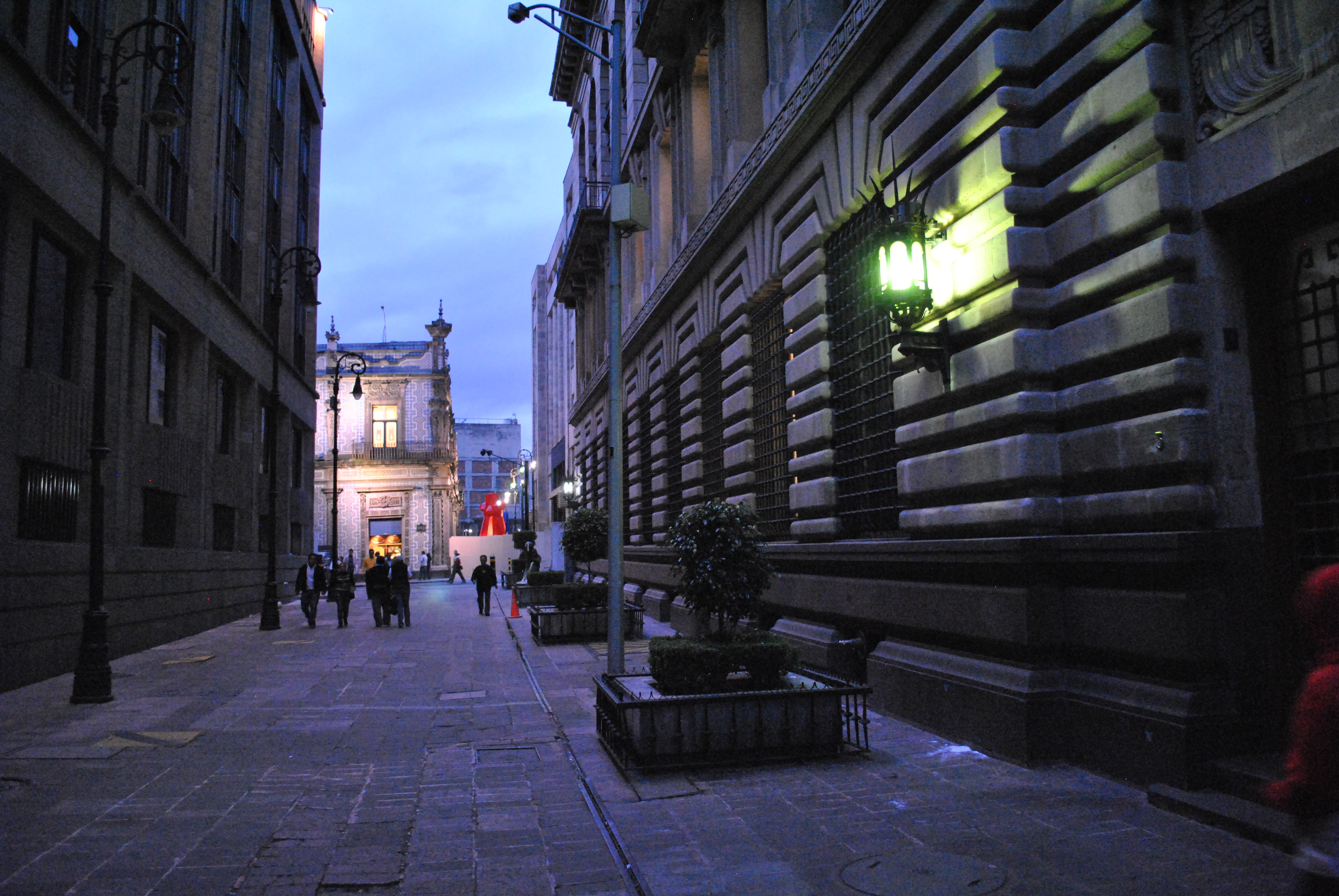
Condesa Street in the Historical Center of Mexico City.

After learning of his death, The Washington Post tweeted that the US Embassy in Mexico was investigating his death. The Post later retracted the tweet after that assertion appeared incorrect. His family with the help of the AP sought more details. The Ministry of Public Security (Mexico City) led an investigation into Montaño's death. One year after his death, the case was still open.

Montaño died on the day before the 2012 Mexican general election but was not reporting on the election. KUSA in Denver, Colorado reported that his last story for the AP was about a shooting involving police and corrupt officers, in which 3 police officers were killed. As a result of that shootout, Mexico replaced just under 350 federal police at the airport in August.

== Personal ==
Armando Montaño grew up Colorado Springs, Colorado and was an aspiring journalist throughout college. He was a graduate of Grinnell College, where he majored in Spanish with a concentration in Latin American studies. He was a member of the National Association of Hispanic Journalists and the National Association of Gay and Lesbian Journalists. A friend of Montaño's told Metro Weekly that Montaño appreciated the perspective and insights gained from identifying as "half-white, half-Mexican, and openly gay."

Born in Massachusetts, he moved to Colorado with his parents, Mario Montaño and Diane Alters, but he also lived in Costa Rica for two years as a child and spent time in Argentina and the US-Mexico border. Montaño's father is a professor and chair of the anthropology department at Colorado College, while his mother is an academic communications specialist and former assistant editor for the Denver Post.

Montaño is Mexican-American, with a white mother and a first-generation Mexican-American father from Texas. Montaño stated in one of his articles that his cousins would call him "Wexican" to refer to his lighter skin. Montaño enjoyed cooking, and learned from his father starting at the age of five. He said it taught him how to channel his frustrations of growing up biracial in the United States and allowed him to create foods that were neither Mexican nor American cuisine.

Services were held July 15, 2012 for Montaño at Shove Memorial Chapel on the Colorado College campus. Later services were held at the Grinnell College campus on 30 September 2012.

== Career ==
While attending the Palmer High School in Colorado Springs, Armando Montaño wrote for the school newspaper and interviewed actress Daryl Hannah and director John Sayles for an interview about their Colorado-based movie "Silver City". In 2007, Montaño was chosen as a guest columnist for the "Colorado Voices" in the Denver Post. He also completed four internships before his death, which allowed him to write political and investigative stories. The newspapers he held the internships with were The New York Times, Chronicle of Higher Education, Seattle Times and Colorado Independent. Montaño also wrote for the Grinnell College school newspaper, known as the Scarlet & Black, in Grinnell, Iowa. He was also a member of the National Association of Hispanic Journalists and the National Association of Gay and Lesbian Journalists.

== Death ==
Armando Montaño died in Mexico City, Mexico on 30 June 2012. He was pronounced dead after being found in an elevator shaft in an apartment building near his home in the Condesa neighborhood. The cause of death was suffocation. Montaño's wallet was gone, but his flip phone was still on his person when he was found. During Montaño's time in Mexico City, he was interning for the Associated Press.

While Montaño was in Mexico, it was considered one of the more dangerous countries for journalists. Although Montaño was not on an assignment at the time of his death, the authorities opened an investigation into the incident. The initial investigation of the situation led to an announcement by the Attorney General of Mexico in July that Montaño's clothing had been caught in the elevator machinery which led to the accident and it was unrelated to his reporting, but his family said that was not correct. The investigation in Mexico City was ongoing as of late 2012, and remains unsolved as of 2017.

Mentioned locations within Mexico relative to the capital Mexico City.

== Reactions ==
Armando Montaño's memorial service at Grinnell College was attended by students, professors, and other faculty members. Montaño became close with professors while at Grinnell College who noted the positive direction of his career at the time of his death. Eliza Willis, professor of Latin American politics, said, “He was very intense about his career plans and his desire to become a journalist." Sarah Purcell, an associate professor of history and director of the Rosenfield Public Affairs Program, said, "He was a remarkable person. My first impression of him was to be incredibly impressed with his enthusiasm and intelligence." She also mentioned his progress: "I’ve seen a lot of reports calling him an aspiring journalist. I think he already was a journalist. He was doing incredible reporting from Mexico. I think it's really a loss for the future of journalism."

Montaño worked for the Associated Press at the time of his death, and Kathleen Carroll, AP executive editor, said, "The loss of Armando is a terrible shock to the AP staff members who were fortunate enough to call him a colleague". And Barb Ellis, Denver Post spokeswoman, said, "His editors here were certain he would go far in the field he loved. Journalism has lost a rising star."

== In popular culture ==
Armando Montaño appeared as a model for Metro Weekly's "Coverboy" series in its 11 August 2011 issue under the name "Mando" when he was 21 years old. In the interview, he revealed that Helen Thomas was an influence in journalism. At the time he was entering his senior year at Grinnell College and studying Spanish and Latin American studies and looking forward to a career in journalism and politics. He posed for medium close-up photographs for the issue. A peer who attended a scholarship program with Montaño said he was excited to be selected for the series.

== Awards ==
In 2015, his parents established an endowment to fund and encourage young writers at Grinnell College.

Shortly after his death, several scholarships and funds were created in memory of Armando Montaño. The annual Armando Montaño Scholarships will be awarded by the New York Times Student Journalism Institute to help deserving students, and the Mando Montaño's Scarlet & Black Fund was established help Grinnell College improve its student newspaper.

While a student, Freedom Forum for Diversity named him a 2011 Chips Quinn Scholar for which he attended training, the National Press Club awarded him its 2008 Ellen Masin Persina Scholarship, the National Association of Hispanic Journalists named him a 2008 Newhouse Scholar.

== Published works of journalism ==
- Armando Montano and Katherine Corcoran, "Mexico airport shooting points to running problems," Yahoo! News (Associated Press), June 26, 2012.
- Pablo Fernandez; with contributions by Luis Andres Henao in Santiago, Chile and Armando Montano in Mexico City, "Uruguay plan to let gov't sell marijuana," Yahoo! News (Associated Press), June 20, 2012.
- Armando Montano and Emoke Bebiak for the Associated Press, "9 young elephants find new home in Mexican zoo," Yahoo! News (Associated Press), June 12, 2012.
- Galia Garcia Palafox and Armando Montano for the Associated Press, "Bieber fans camp out in Mexico before free concert," Associated Press, June 10, 2012.
- Montano, Armando (March 12, 2012). "The unexpected lessons of Mexican food". Salon. Archived from the original on November 26, 2012.
- Michael Barbaro and Ashely Parker; with contributions by Steven Yaccino and Armando Montano, "Voters Examining Candidates, Often to a Fault," The New York Times, December 30, 2011.
- Solomon Miller and Armando Montaño (video narrated by Armando Montaño), "Bachmann snubs Grinnell College students," Scarlet & Black, October 6, 2011.
- Armando Montano, "A History Professor Unfolds Florida's Vivid and Violent Past," The Chronicle of Higher Education, September 25, 2011.
- Armando Montano for the Associated Press, "Argentine gays proud of 500 same-sex marriages," WGLB (Associated Press), November 8, 2010.
