= Frederick H. Cossitt Library =

- U.S. National Register of Historic Places
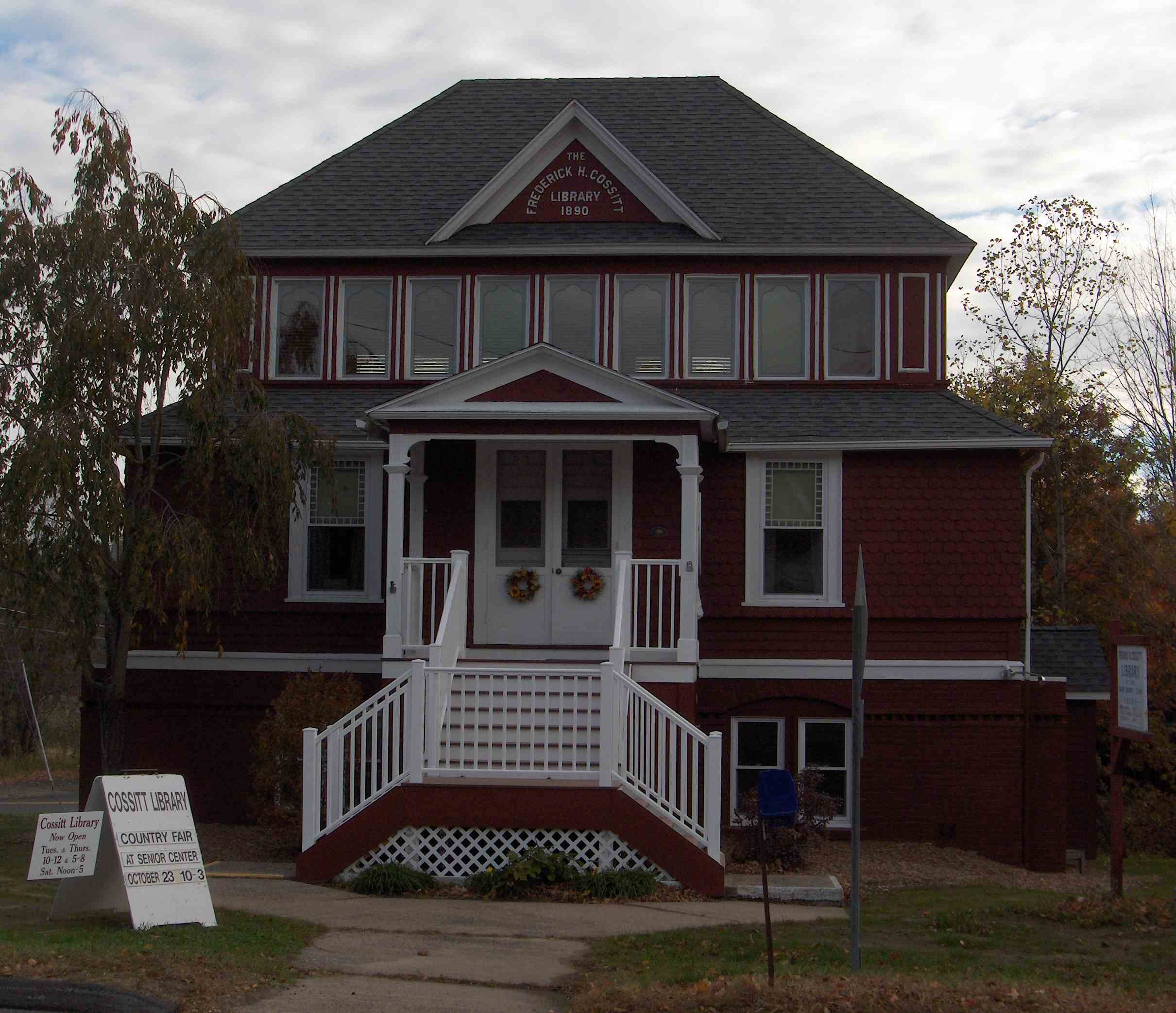

- Location within Connecticut Location within the United States
- Location: 388 North Granby Road, Granby, Connecticut
- Coordinates: 41°59′45″N 72°49′51″W
- Area: 0.3 acres (0.12 ha)
- Built: 1890
- Built by: T. J. Greene
- Architect: Jasper D. Sibley
- Architectural style: Queen Anne
- NRHP reference No.: 88000708
- Added to NRHP: June 22, 1988

The Frederick H. Cossitt Library is a historic library building at 388 North Granby Road in Granby, Connecticut. It is a Queen Anne style building, designed by Jasper D. Sibley and built in 1890. Construction of the library was championed by George S. Godard, later librarian of the Connecticut State Library, and was funded by a bequest from Granby native Frederick H. Cossitt, a wealthy New York businessman. It was listed on the National Register of Historic Places in 1988. It continues to serve as a branch of the town's public library system.

== Description and history ==
The Frederick H. Cossitt Library stands in the crossroads village of North Granby, at the southeast corner of East Street (Connecticut Route 539) and North Granby Road (Connecticut Route 189). It is a two-story wood frame structure, roughly square in plan, with a brick-faced first floor and a clapboarded second level. It is topped by a hip roof with a tall central clerestory window band. The main entrance is on the second level, sheltered by a gabled porch supported by square columns. The brickwork and trim are detailed in the Queen Anne Victorian style.

The library, the town's first, was built in 1890 to a design by Jasper D. Sibley of Middletown, and is one of the town's finest examples of Queen Anne architecture. Its construction was spearheaded by George S. Godard, who had taken a position as trustee of the town library while still studying library science at Wesleyan University, and Godard became its first librarian. He went on to have a long and successful career as the state librarian. Funding for the library was given by Frederick H. Cossitt, a wealthy New York businessman whose family ancestry extends back to Granby in the mid-18th century.

== See also ==
- Frederick H. Cossitt Memorial Hall, Colorado Springs, Colorado, also NRHP-listed
- Memphis Public Library, Memphis, Tennessee, construction also originally funded by Frederick H. Cossitt
- National Register of Historic Places listings in Hartford County, Connecticut
