= Dickinson Branch Library =

- U.S. National Register of Historic Places
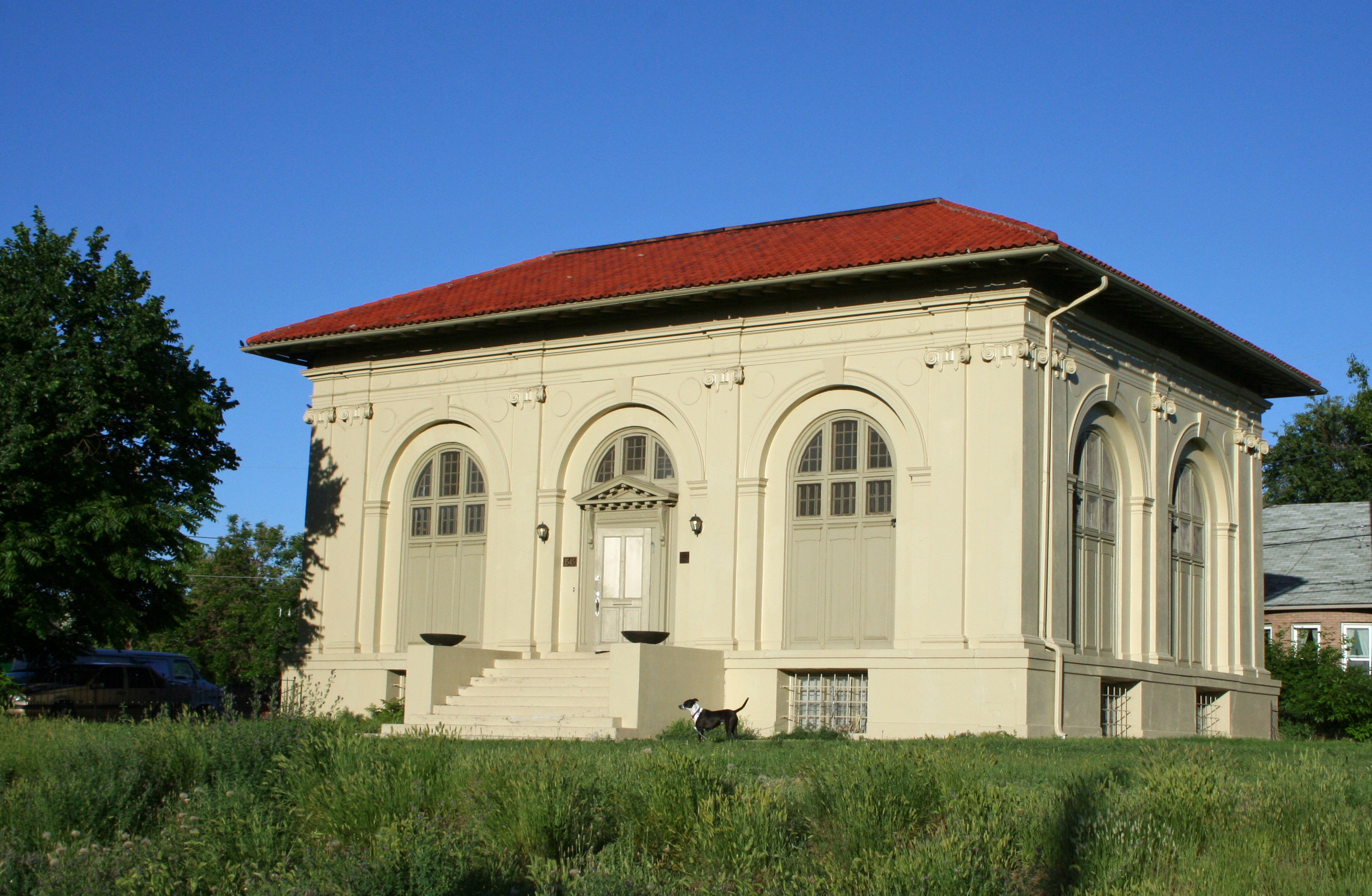
- Library in 2009

- Location within Colorado
- Location: 1545 Hooker St., Denver, Colorado
- Coordinates: 39°44′29″N 105°01′41″W
- Area: less than one acre
- Built: 1914
- Architect: Maurice Biscoe
- Artists: Allen Tupper True; Dudley Carpenter
- Architectural style: Renaissance
- NRHP reference No.: 02000262
- Added to NRHP: March 28, 2002

The Dickinson Branch Library, at 1545 Hooker St. in the West Colfax neighborhood of Denver, Colorado, is a Carnegie library which was built in 1914. It was listed on the National Register of Historic Places in 2002.

It was designed by architect Maurice Biscoe in Italian Renaissance Revival style. Above a raised concrete basement, it is built of brick covered by white concrete stucco. It was originally light ivory in color with a sage green base. It has a hipped roof of red Spanish tile with broad overhanging eaves supported by wooden brackets, and a broad cornice "ornamented with ceramic tiles of heraldic designs, originally in brilliant colors. The tiles, now painted over, were blue-green squares attached to circular tiles set into the stucco finish. The tiles are of an alternating square and diamond pattern."

The library included mural work by Allen Tupper True, "Colorado's most prolific mural painter", and relief sculpture by Denver artist and sculptor Dudley Carpenter. The murals and relief sculptures were removed from the building after the library was closed, and, as of 2001, their locations were unknown.

It has also been known as the Charles E. Dickinson Branch Library, as the Carnegie Dickinson Library, and as the West Denver Branch Library.

It was one of four Carnegie libraries funded by an $80,000 grant in 1912, which were all opened in 1913 "to much fanfare", three years after the main Denver Public Library was opened in 1910. The other three were the Roger W. Woodbury Branch Library, the Sarah Platt Decker Branch Library, and the Henry White Warren Branch Library.

It was deemed significant "for its association with the nationwide public library movement sponsored and funded by grants from Andrew Carnegie's philanthropic foundation, ...for its association with the City of Denver's efforts to create a system of branch public libraries, [and] ... as an important example of the work of Denver architect Maurice Biscoe."

It is located in west Denver at the southwest corner of Hooker Street and Conejos Place, near major boulevards West Colfax Avenue and Federal Boulevard.

== See also ==
- National Register of Historic Places listings in west Denver
