= Montgomery Hall, Colorado College =

- Montgomery Hall
- U.S. National Register of Historic Places
- Colorado State Register of Historic Properties
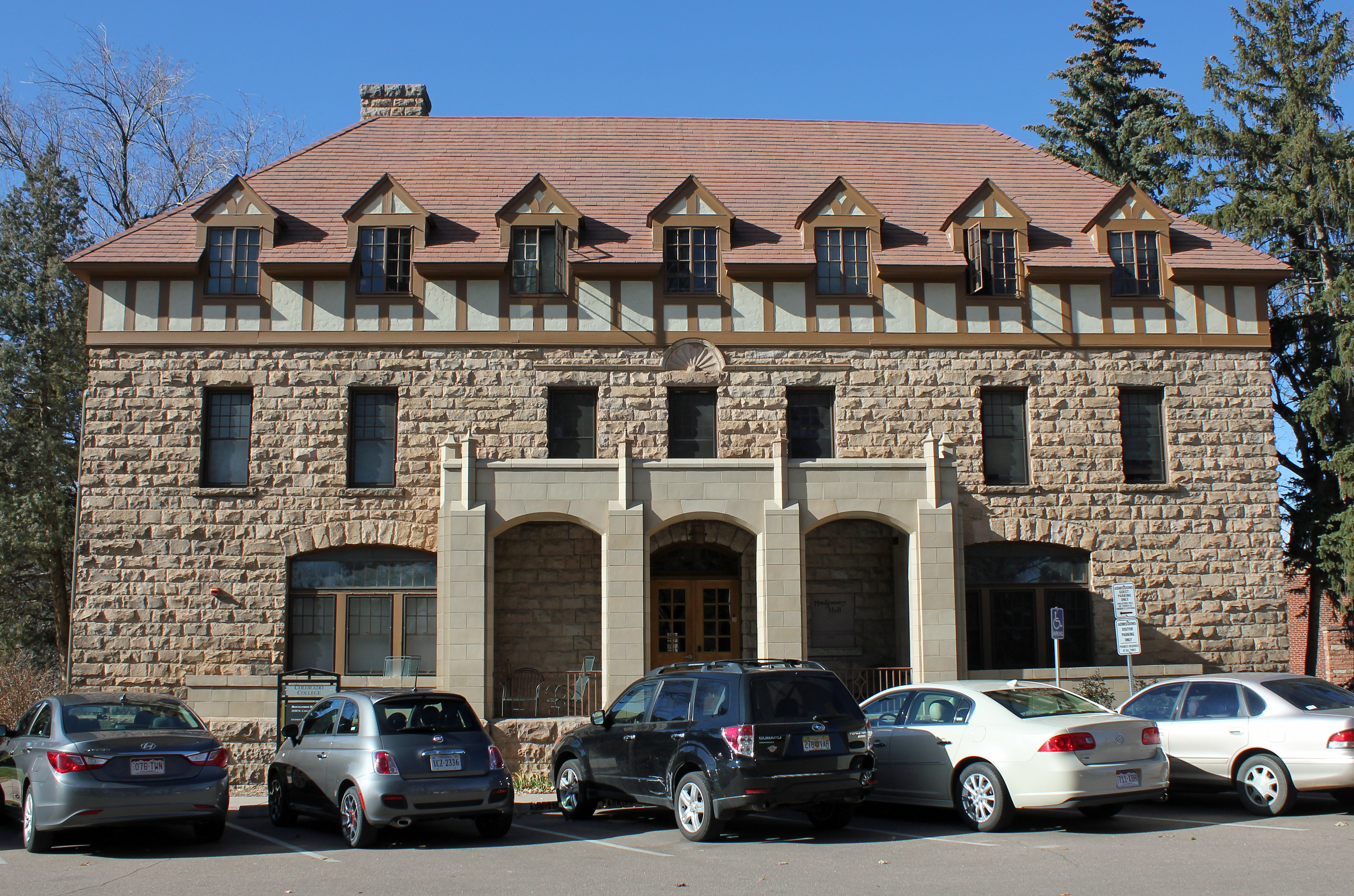

- Location within Colorado
- Location: 1030 N. Cascade Avenue
- Coordinates: 38°50′56″N 104°49′33″W
- Built: 1891
- Architect: Walter F. Douglas
- Architectural style: Tudor Revival
- NRHP reference No.: 90001419
- Added to NRHP: September 13, 1990

Montgomery Hall is a historical building located on the Colorado College Campus that was added to the NRHP on September 13, 1990. It is the second oldest building on the campus. It is used as a dormitory for women attending Colorado College. Montgomery Hall was named after Elizabeth Robinson Montgomery, the sister of the college's President William F. Slocum's wife.
