= Richthofen Castle =

- U.S. National Register of Historic Places
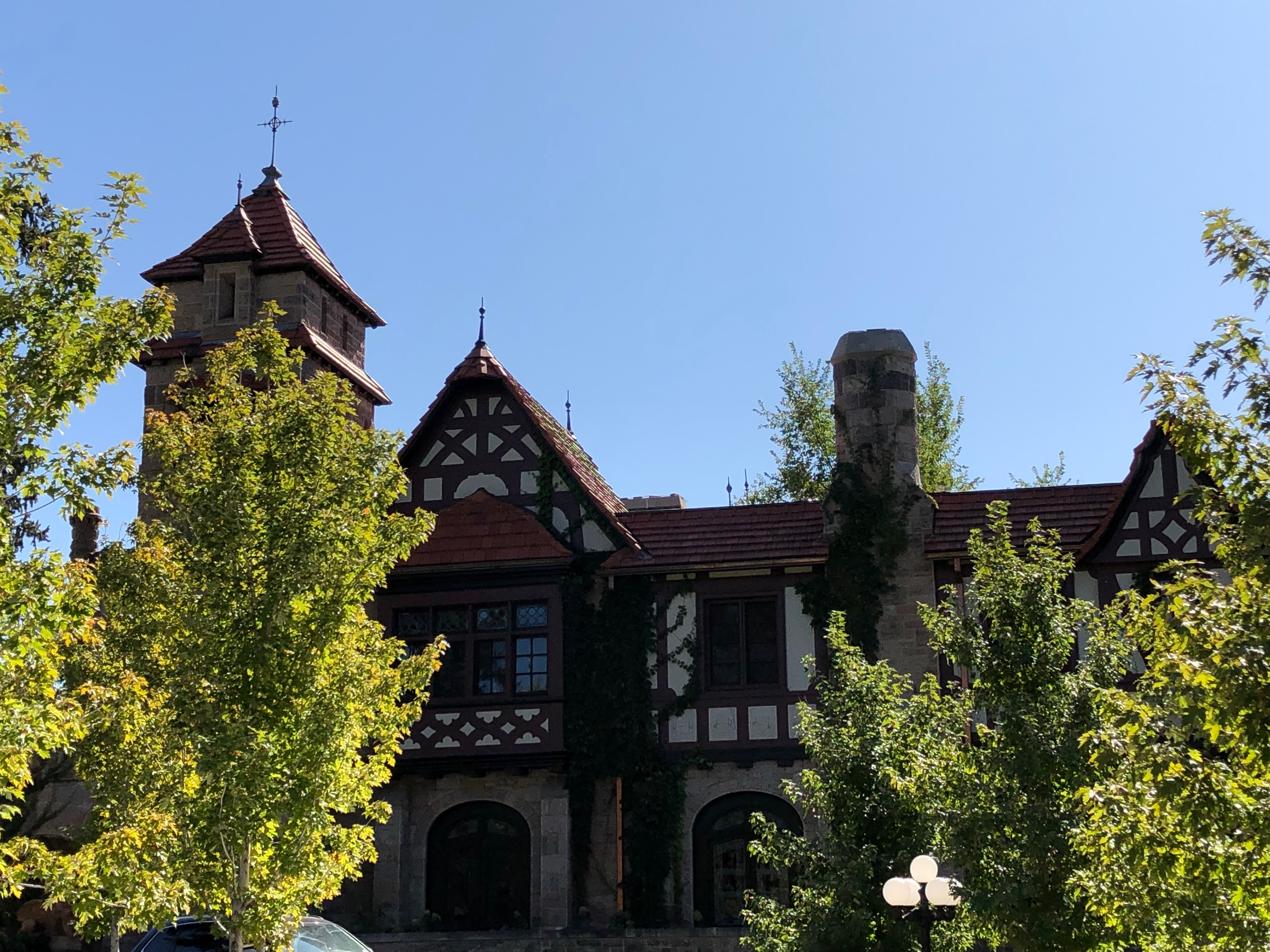
- Location: 7020 E 12th Ave, Montclair, Denver, Colorado
- Coordinates: 39°44′07″N 104°54′22″W
- Built: 1887
- Architect: Alexander Cazin; Biscoe & Hewitt; Jacques Benedict
- Architectural style: Gothic Revival, Tudor Revival
- NRHP reference No.: 75000511
- Added to NRHP: April 21, 1975

Richthofen Castle is a historic 35-room mansion in the neighborhood of Montclair in the City and County of Denver, Colorado, United States. Completed in 1887, it was originally designed by Alexander Cazin for Baron Walter von Richthofen, a German immigrant and member of the prominent Richthofen aristocratic family. Additions and remodels on the house were later made by Biscoe & Hewitt in 1910 and Jules Jacques Benedict in 1924. The mansion was listed on the National Register of Historic Places in 1975.
