= Frederick H. Cossitt Memorial Hall =

- U.S. National Register of Historic Places
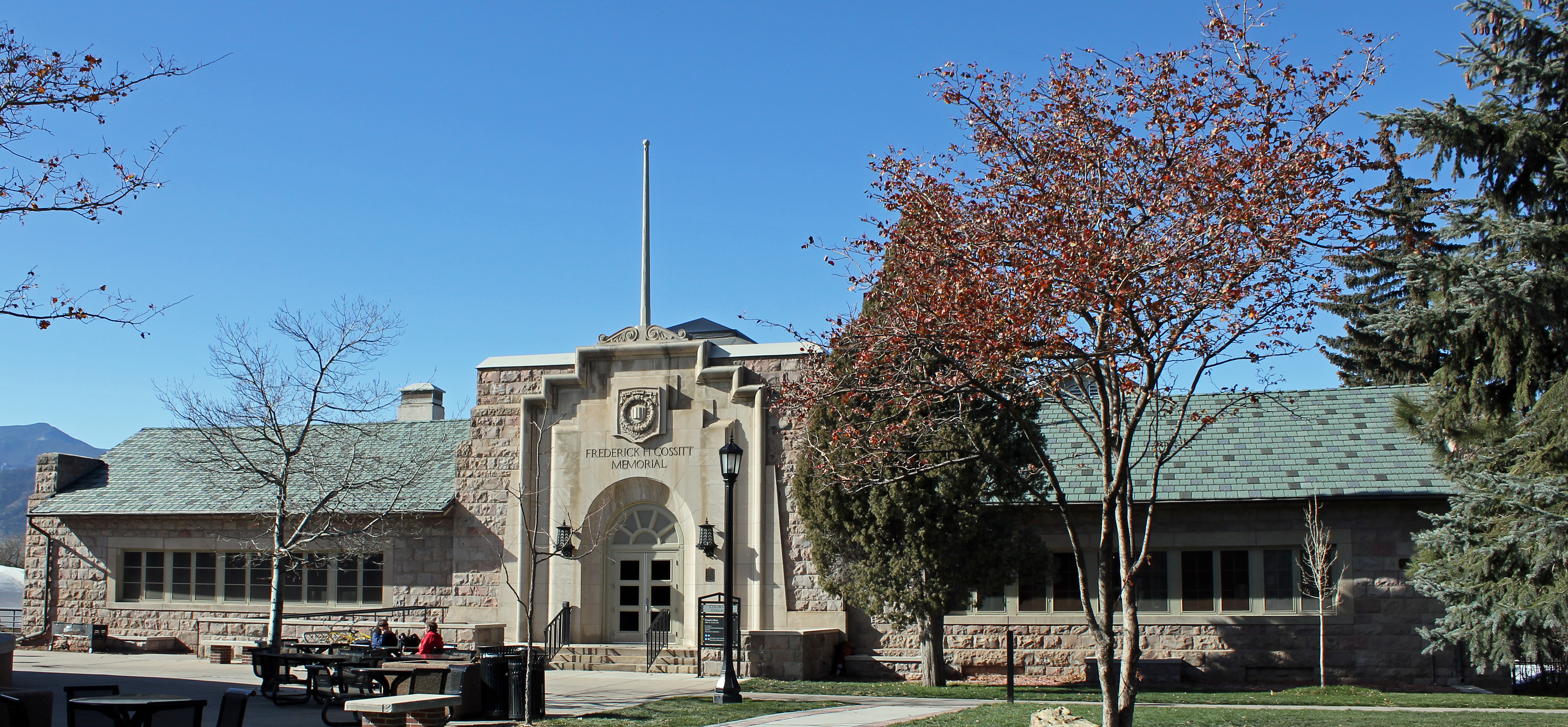
- Cossitt Hall on the Colorado College Campus

- Location within Colorado Location within the United States
- Location: 906 N. Cascade Ave., Colorado Springs, Colorado
- Coordinates: 38°50′51″N 104°49′34″W
- Area: less than one acre
- Built: 1914
- Architect: Biscoe, Maurice B.
- Architectural style: Late 19th and 20th Century Revivals
- MPS: Colorado College MPS
- NRHP reference No.: 97000272
- Added to NRHP: March 28, 1997

The Frederick H. Cossitt Memorial Hall, located at 906 N. Cascade Ave. in Colorado Springs, Colorado, was built in 1914. It has also been known as Cossitt Hall and was funded by a donation by Mrs. Helen Cossitt Juilliard in honor of her father. It was designed by Maurice B. Biscoe. It is part of Colorado College. It was listed on the National Register of Historic Places in 1997.

== See also ==
- Frederick H. Cossitt Library, Granby, Connecticut, also NRHP-listed
