= Montclair, Denver =

Neighborhood in Denver, Colorado, United States of America

Montclair on this map of Denver's neighborhoods

Montclair is a neighborhood in the City and County of Denver, Colorado, United States. The Denver U.S. Post Office (ZIP Code 80220) serves Montclair postal addresses.

== Neighborhood history ==
Montclair was originally developed as a small suburban community east of Denver. The land was purchased and developed by the Montclair Town and Improvement Company in 1885. One of its founders, Matthias P. Cochrane, originally came from Montclair, New Jersey and named the new community in its honor. The other founder, Baron Walter von Richthofen, was a German nobleman and uncle to Manfred von Richthofen, the celebrated World War I flying ace known as the 'Red Baron'. The community was originally designed to attract wealthier residents who were turned off by Denver's "400 saloons and forty Market Street bordellos". To this end, homeowners were required to purchase and build on lots that were twice the Denver standard size of 25 feet by 125 feet. Homes were required to be at least three stories high, made of brick or stone. In addition, town trustees had to approve all plans and saloons and alcohol were forbidden.

The community became the incorporated town of Montclair in 1888. In 1893, the crash of the silver market and the ensuing Panic of 1893 brought all development to a halt. Baron von Richthofen then began to promote the town as a health retreat, calling it the 'Carlsbad of Colorado'. However, due to his sudden death from appendicitis in 1898, plans for a health spa, art museum, hotel, gymnasium, casino and pavilions never materialized. By 1900, the US Census recorded only eighty-eight families living in Montclair.

In 1902, the newly created City and County of Denver began to incorporate the town of Montclair. The town objected strongly to its inclusion and fought the City of Denver all the way to the State Supreme Court. Montclair lost and annexation was made final in 1903. Then-mayor Robert W. Speer eased the transition by beautifying and extending Richthofen's system of parkways and boulevards from the central city into the suburb, planting many trees and erecting fountains and monuments. In 1907, the Montclair Improvement Association was formed to push the City of Denver into providing "graded, curbed, oiled and lighted streets, water and gas mains, a sewer system, parks and parkways and other services."

== Historic District and Community Association ==
In the 1960s Denver, along with many cities across the country, began to experience problems with urban decay and suburban flight. Crime, welfare, unemployment and overcrowding rates all rose. In 1968, a successor to the dormant Improvement Association was created, called the Montclair Community Association (MCA) which eventually became the Historic Montclair Community Association, Inc. (HMCAI).

Jane Smith, a Montclair preservationist, began pushing the idea of a historic district in 1973. In 1975, residents and the Denver City Council voted to make the central heart of Montclair a historic district. This made Montclair one of the first neighborhoods to seek landmark designation, and the district was the fifth city-designated landmark district.

Precisely the same requirements that made Montclair exclusive at the turn of the century became a driving force behind the establishment of the district - the neighborhood includes grand old trees, large lots, and distinctive houses, including nineteenth-century Victorian architecture and Queen Anne style architecture in the United States as well as 'TB houses' designed specifically for tuberculosis sufferers. However, during the twentieth century these original homes were joined by bungalows, cottages, Tudor Revival, and modern Ranch-style houses.

As Denver architect and architectural critic Tom Morris puts it, "Montclair buildings are a catalog of architectural styles from 1885 to the present. If a person is interested in what the American suburban dream might look like if ever brought to fruition, Montclair is its living model."

In addition to land marking the architectural merit of Montclair, the historic district designation served as a means of community preservation and revitalization.

== Geography ==
Montclair is located at 39°44′06″N 104°54′32″W (39.734914,-104.908769). The neighborhood boundaries are Colfax Ave to the north, 6th Ave to the south, Holly Street to the west and Quebec to the east.

What is commonly known as East Montclair is located east of Quebec, north of 11th Ave, south of Colfax and west of Yosemite. Montclair Post Office is located in East Montclair, which borders Lowry to the south and Aurora to the east.

== Parks ==
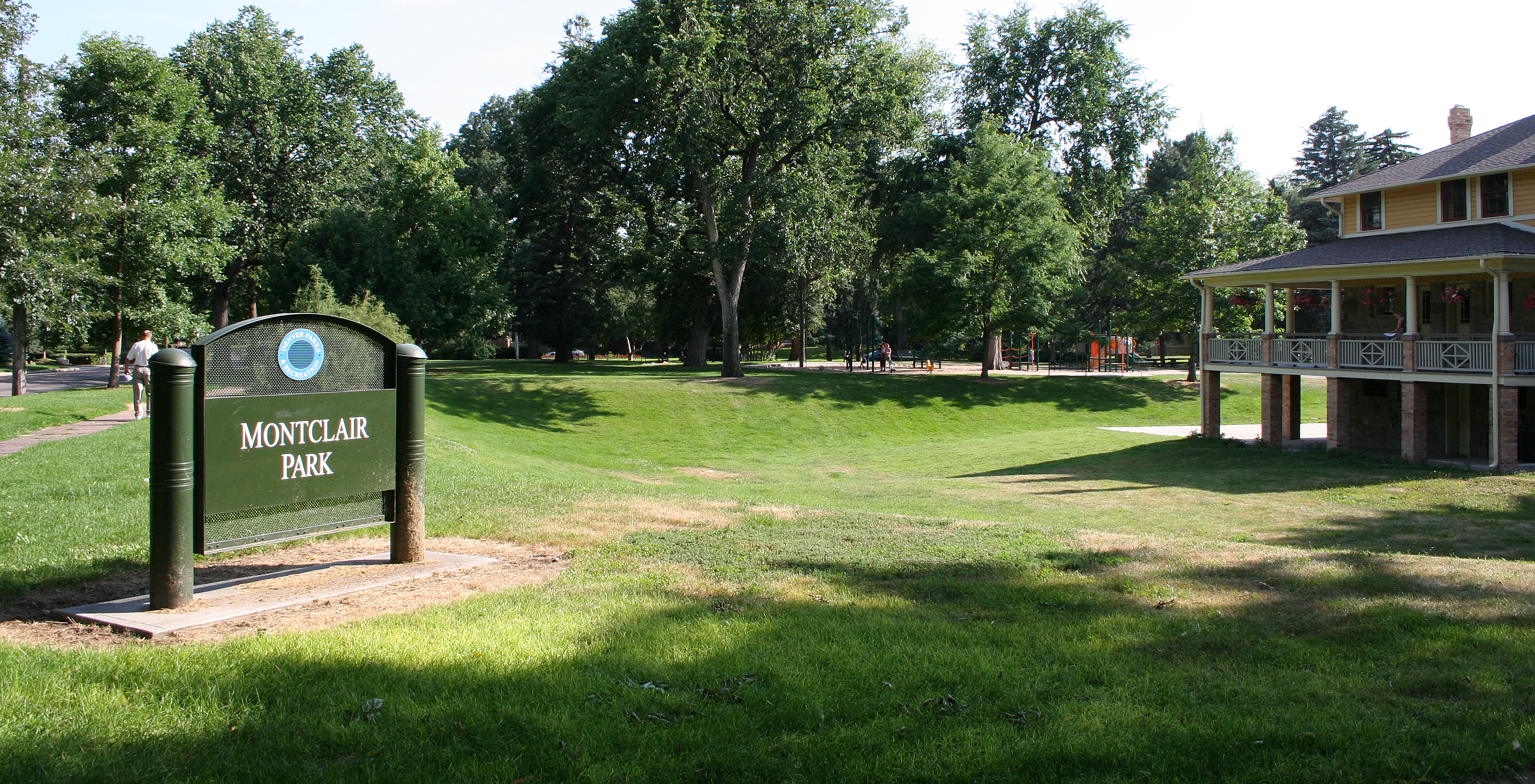
Montclair Park

Montclair has four city parks:

- Montclair Park, located at Richthofen Place Parkway and Oneida St
- Mayfair Park, located at 10th and Jersey St
- Kittredge Park, located at 9th Ave and Olive St
- Denison Park, located at Richthofen Pl and Quebec St

== Schools ==
Montclair is home to Montclair Elementary School in the 1151 Newport St and Palmer Elementary School at 955 Grape St. Montclair Elementary is a Denver Public School serving grades K-5. Starting in 2005 Montclair has seen a rebound in neighborhood attendance.

St. James Catholic School (preschool - 8) and Paddington Station (preschool) are both private schools located in the Montclair neighborhood.

== See also ==
- Bibliography of Colorado
- Geography of Colorado
- History of Colorado
- Index of Colorado-related articles
- List of Colorado-related lists
  - List of neighborhoods in Denver
  - List of populated places in Colorado
- Outline of Colorado
