= Richthofen family =

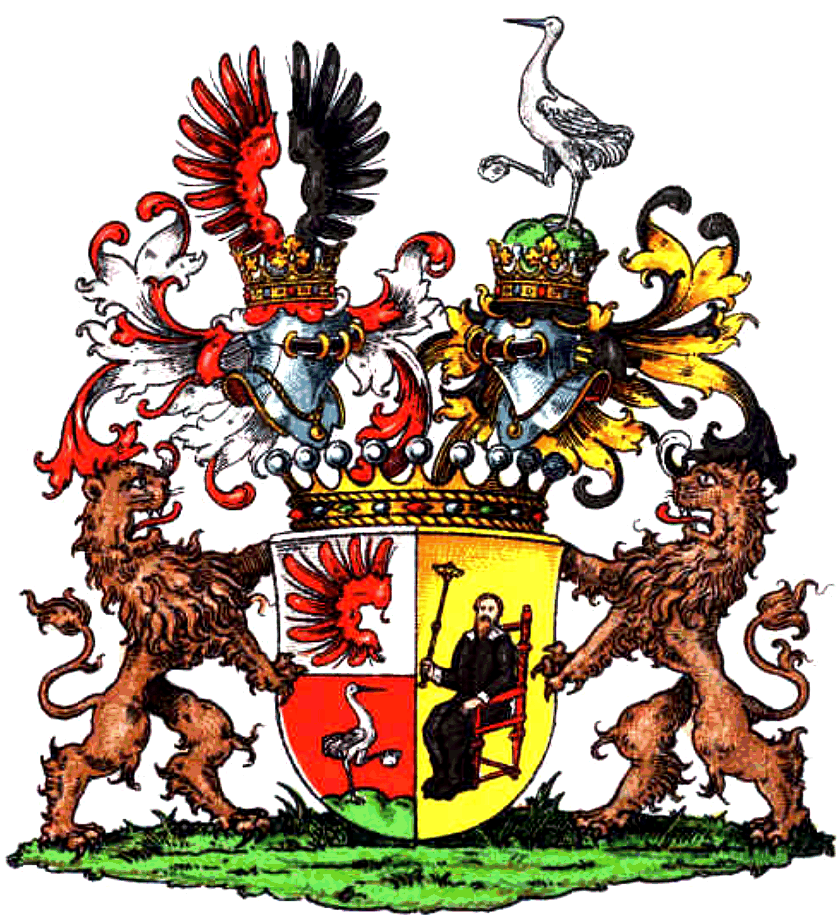
Coat of arms of the Counts von Richthofen (1901)

The Richthofen family is an old and prominent German noble family, whose members held the title of Baron in Bohemia and Count in the Kingdom of Prussia. The most famous member is the air ace Manfred von Richthofen (1892–1918), also known as the "Red Baron", but a number of other members of his family are also notable for various reasons.

== Walter von Richthofen ==
Baron Walter von Richthofen, an uncle of Manfred von Richthofen, immigrated to the United States in 1877 from Silesia. He founded the Denver Chamber of Commerce and was co-founder of Montclair, Denver, at that time a village east of Denver but now incorporated into the city. His Richthofen Castle was one of the most sumptuous mansions in the American West. Begun in 1883 and completed in 1887, it was modeled on the original Richthofen Castle in Germany. Located immediately around the castle are the baron's mistress's house and his sanitarium/dairy.

== World War I flying aces ==
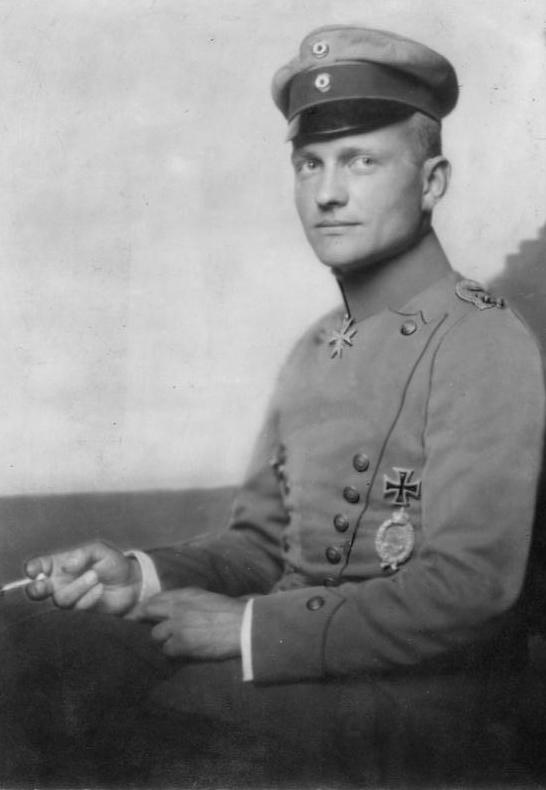
Portrait of Manfred von Richthofen

Manfred von Richthofen was the most successful fighter pilot of World War I, with 80 official victories before he was killed in action.

His younger brother, Lothar von Richthofen (1894–1922), was also a flying ace, with 40 victories. He served alongside his brother in Jasta 11. Lothar died in an air crash in 1922.

The two aviators were fourth cousins of the German World War II field marshal Wolfram von Richthofen (1895–1945). Wolfram was a cavalry man and later a World War I flying ace who flew with Manfred and Lothar in Jagdgeschwader 1 during the last year of the war.

== Frieda and Else von Richthofen ==
Frieda von Richthofen (1879–1956), who married the English novelist D. H. Lawrence (1885–1930) in July 1914, was a distant cousin. Though their last common ancestor was born in 1661, the Red Baron's fame nonetheless attached to Frieda's reputation in war time England.

Frieda's sister Else von Richthofen was one of the earliest female social scientists in Germany.

== Suzane Louise von Richthofen ==
Suzane Louise von Richthofen (born 3 November 1983) is a Brazilian woman who was convicted of murdering her parents on 31 October 2002 with the help of her boyfriend and his brother. She was put on trial in São Paulo in July 2006 and was sentenced to 39 years and 6 months in prison. In 2023 she was released from prison on parole.

== Ambassadors ==
- Herbert von Richthofen was an ambassador to Bulgaria between 1938 and 1941.
- Dr. Hermann von Richthofen (grand-nephew of Frieda and Else), was German Ambassador to the United Kingdom from 1989–1993, where his name made him a media favorite.

== Other ==
Other well-known family members include:

- Bolko von Richthofen (1899–1983), German archaeologist (not to be confused with Manfred's younger brother)
- Emil von Richthofen (1810–1895), Prussian diplomat and father of Oswald von Richthofen
- Ferdinand von Richthofen (1833–1905), German traveller, geographer and scientist, for whom Colorado's Mount Richthofen was named
- Manfred von Richthofen (general) (1855–1939), German General of the Cavalry during World War I
- Manfred von Richthofen (sports official) (1934–2014), German hockey player and coach
- Oswald von Richthofen (1847–1906), German diplomat and politician
