= Cutler Hall =

- U.S. National Register of Historic Places
- Colorado State Register of Historic Properties No. 5EP.3951
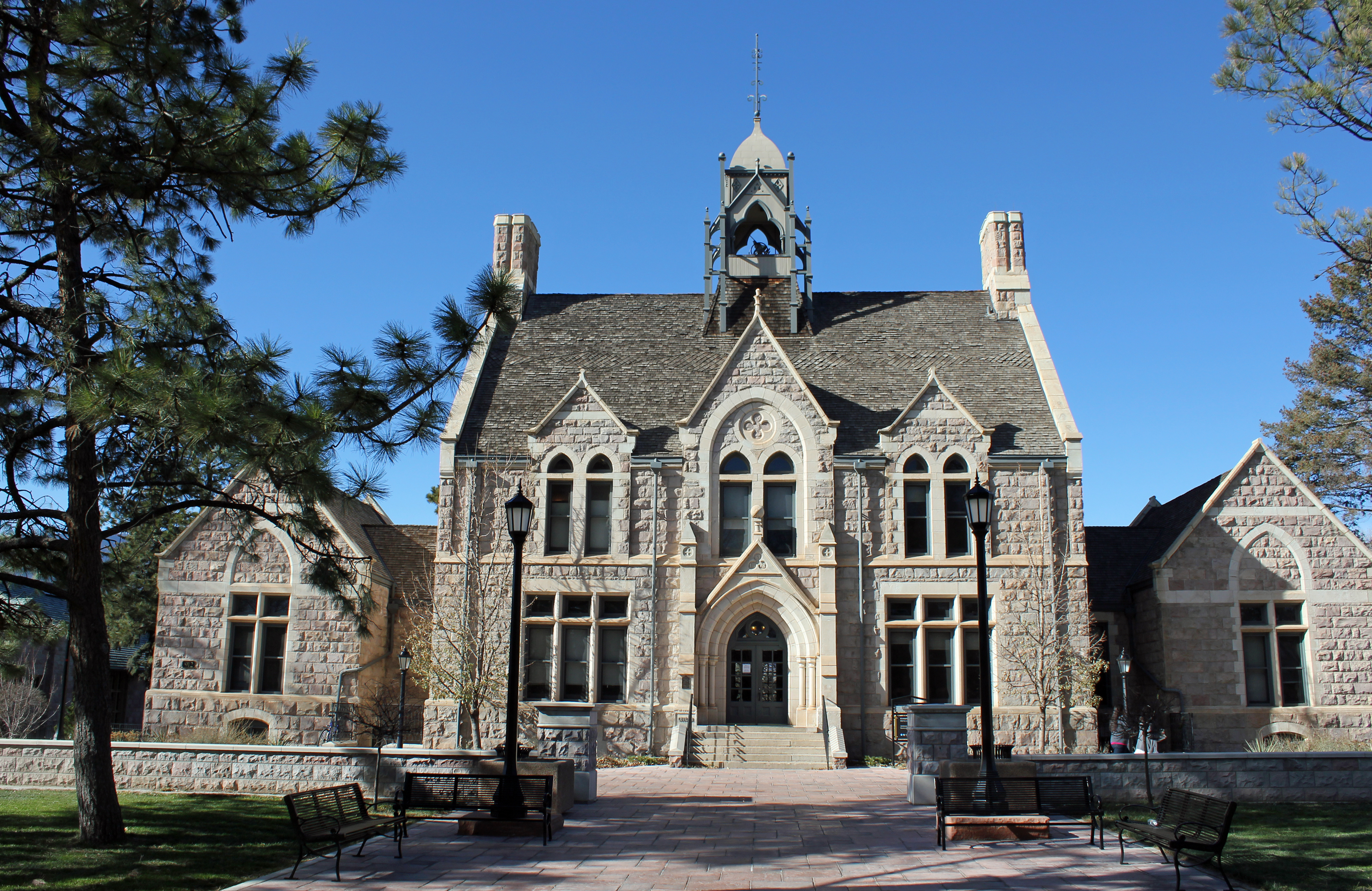

- Location within Colorado Location within the United States
- Location: 912 N. Cascade Avenue, Colorado Springs, Colorado
- Coordinates: 38°50′53″N 104°49′30″W
- Built: 1877-1880
- Architect: Joseph Dozier, Peabody & Stearns
- Architectural style: Gothic
- NRHP reference No.: 86001410
- CSRHP No.: 5EP.3951

Significant dates
- Added to NRHP: July 3, 1986
- Designated CSRHP: July 3, 1986

The Cutler Hall is a Gothic library building on the Colorado College campus in Colorado Springs, Colorado. The building is on the National Register of Historic Places.

It was the first building on the Colorado College campus, built between 1877 and 1880. Called "the College" it held all the offices, classrooms, a library, auditorium, and more for the burgeoning school. It is now used by the financial aid and admissions departments.

== History ==
Major Henry McAlister donated land for the construction of a building. Peabody and Stearns, an architectural organization in Boston, was hired to design the building. The High Victorian Gothic building was built between 1877 and 1880 and between 1881 and 1882 wings were added to the building. It look several years to complete the building, due to lack of funding. William Jackson Palmer, realizing the importance of the college to the new city, provided the funding necessary to complete construction of the building. It was the first college building, and was first called "the College" and included all the necessary rooms for the college: classrooms, library, combination auditorium and chapel, and a chemistry lab. The college also taught students for the affiliated Cutler Academy, a preparatory school.

The school taught metallurgy and chemistry courses, such as assaying and blowpipe analysis, which attracted prospectors and miners to the school, such as Winfield Scott Stratton. It taught physics and other sciences, and was involved in early study of x-ray photography. Artus Van Briggle studied local clays and pottery, later founding the Van Briggle Pottery company.

The building was named "Palmer Hall" in 1889 in honor of William Jackson Palmer's dedication to the college. Palmer funded the construction of a science building. The new building was named Palmer Hall, and the original college building was named Cutler Hall for philanthropist Henry Cutler who was a contributor to the college. Cutler Academy classes were held until 1914.

The bell on top of the building was used to call students to classes, and students rang the bell after athletic victories. The bell was rung vigorously at the end of World War II by Marine students. It fell and was irreparably damaged. The Navy loaned a bell to the school from the World War II carrier, the U.S.S. Geneva.

The hall was renovated in 1937 for college administrative offices, and geology classes were still conducted in the building. In 1966 college administrative offices moved to Armstrong Hall, and the Education Department moved its offices to Cutler Hall. The building was remodeled in 1972 and alumni affairs, public information, yearbook and college publication offices moved into the hall. College relations and development offices moved into the all in the 1980s.

Colorado Historical Fund grants provided funds in the 1990s for restoration of the exterior and windows.

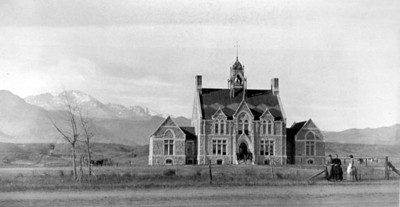
Cutler Hall, Colorado College, 1882

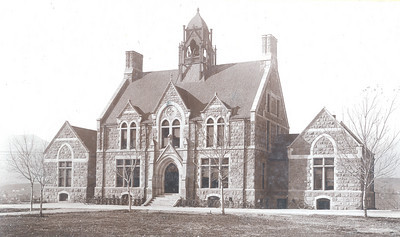
Cutler Hall, Colorado College, about 1901

== Current use ==
The hall now has the financial aid and admissions offices.

== Recognition ==
The American Institute of Architects named Culter Hall as one of the top 20 buildings in the Pikes Peak Region.

== See also ==
- History of Colorado Springs, Colorado
