= Bemis Hall (Colorado Springs, Colorado) =

Historic building in Colorado, US

- U.S. National Register of Historic Places
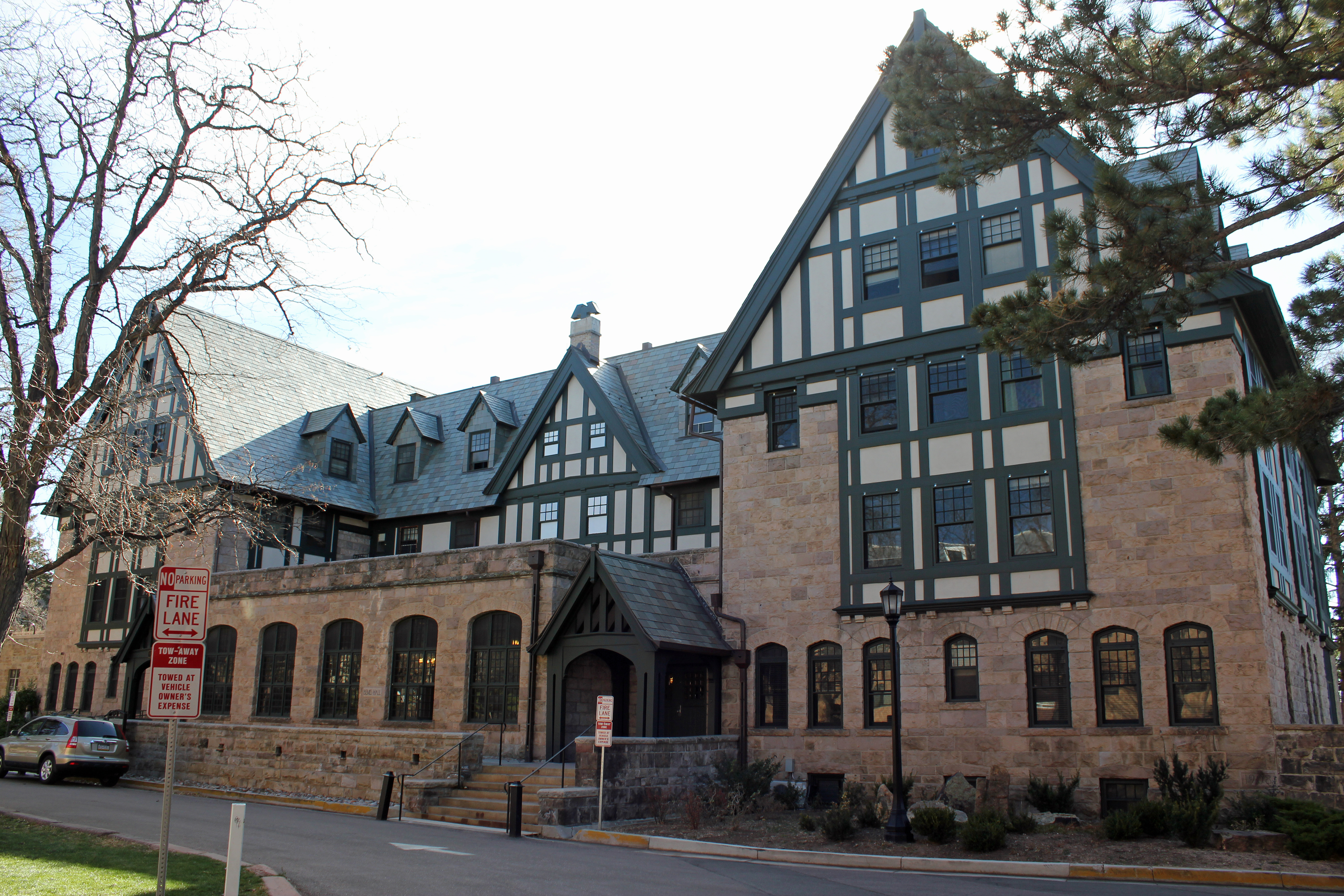

- Location within Colorado Springs, Colorado Location within Colorado Location within the United States
- Location: 920 N. Cascade Ave., Colorado Springs, Colorado
- Coordinates: 38°50′54″N 104°49′34″W
- Area: less than one acre
- Built: 1908
- Architect: Biscoe, Maurice B.
- Architectural style: Tudor Revival
- MPS: Colorado College MPS
- NRHP reference No.: 97000273
- Added to NRHP: March 28, 1997

Bemis Hall, a Tudor Revival-style building of Colorado College, in Colorado Springs, Colorado, was built as a dormitory in 1908. It was designed by architect Maurice B. Biscoe. It was listed on the National Register of Historic Places in 1997.

Major donations towards funding the building were provided by General William Jackson Palmer, founder of Colorado Springs and Colorado College, and by Judson M. Bemis, a manufacturer who moved to Colorado Springs in 1881.
