= Richthofen Place Parkway =

- U.S. National Register of Historic Places
- Colorado State Register of Historic Properties
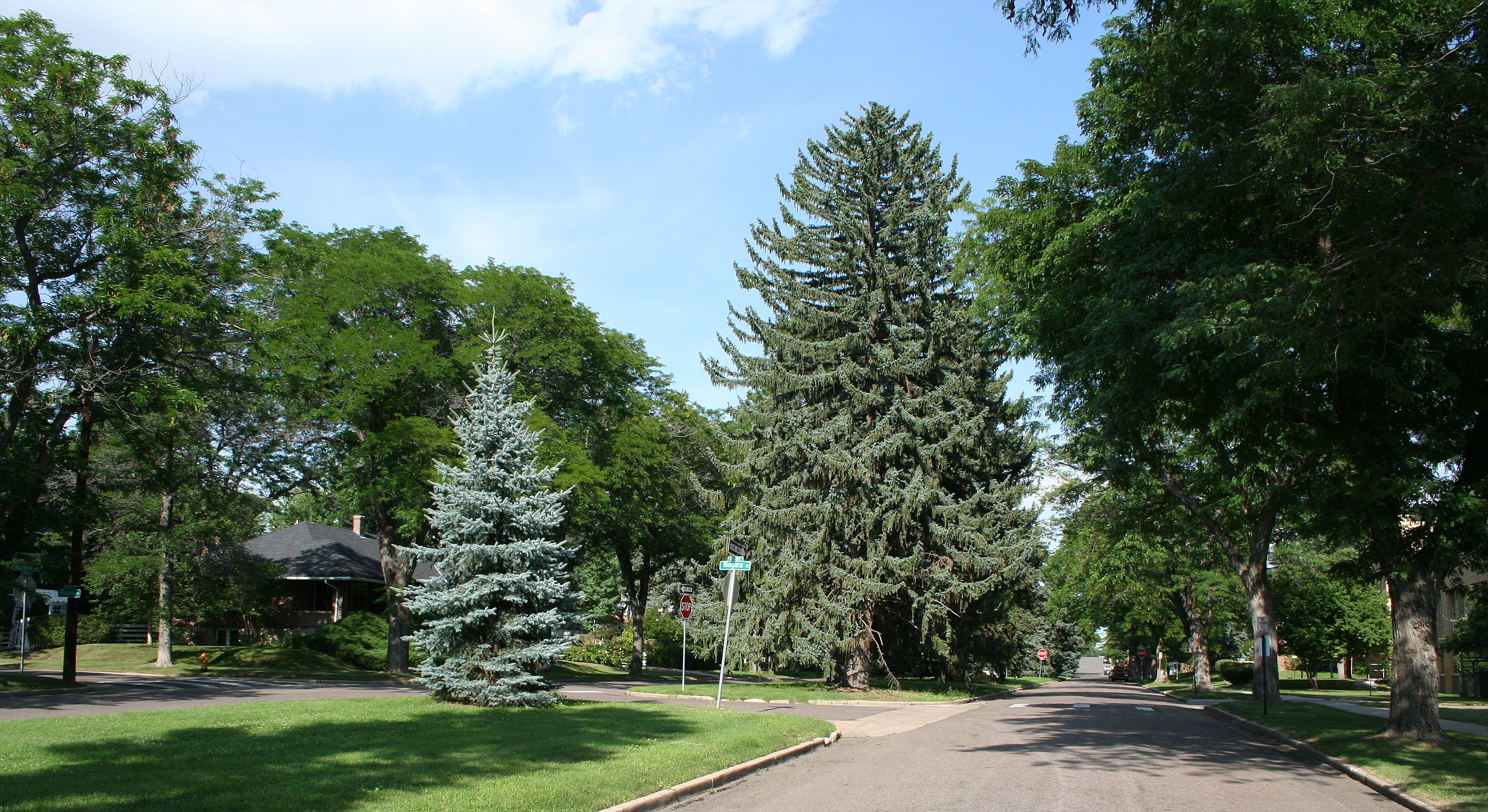
- A view of the Richthofen Place Parkway looking towards the east.

- Location within Colorado Location within the United States
- Location: Richthofen Pl. Pkwy. from Monaco St. Pkwy. to Oneida St., Denver, Colorado
- Coordinates: 39°44′3″N 104°54′27″W
- Area: 3.2 acres (1.3 ha)
- Built: 1911
- Architect: Frederick W. Ameter
- MPS: Denver Park and Parkway System TR
- NRHP reference No.: 86002209
- CSRHP No.: 5DV.5327
- Added to NRHP: September 17, 1986

Richthofen Place Parkway is a historic parkway in Denver, Colorado. On September 17, 1986, it was added to the National Register of Historic Places.
