= Shove Memorial Chapel =

Historic chapel in Colorado, US

- U.S. National Register of Historic Places
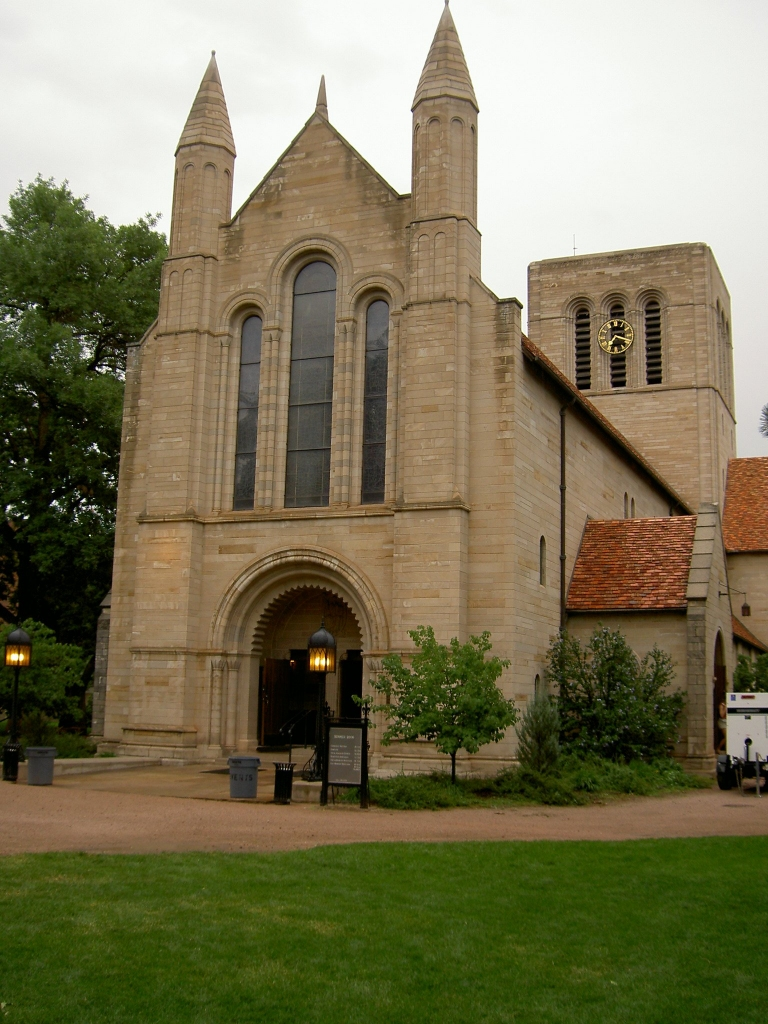

- Location within Colorado Location within the United States
- Location: 1010 N. Nevada Ave., Colorado Springs, Colorado
- Coordinates: 38°50′52″N 104°49′16″W
- Built: 1930-31
- Architect: John Grey
- Architectural style: Romanesque
- NRHP reference No.: 05000426
- Added to NRHP: May 22, 2005

The Shove Memorial Chapel is a Norman Romanesque chapel located on the campus of Colorado College in Colorado Springs, Colorado, United States. It was designed by John Grey and built from 1930 to 1931 and has been on the National Register of Historic Places since May 22, 2005.

John Gray, the architect, made a very comprehensive plan of the chapel, and hired various craftsmen from around the country to apply the detail he wanted. The chapel is made from Bedford limestone mined and cut in Indiana, and Robert Garrison designed gargoyles and exterior sculptures around the building. Robert E. Wade painted the ornate roof inside the chapel, and Joseph Reynolds Jr. designed the stained glass windows.

Despite being built in the middle of the Great Depression, it is widely considered to be one of the finest examples of Norman Romanesque architecture in the state of Colorado. The chapel is located on the main quadrangle of Colorado College.

On the master bell of the chapel, Westminster quarter chimes cast in Croydon, England, there is an engraving of a statement by poet Kahlil Gibran: "Yesterday is but today's memory, and tomorrow is today's dream."

== See also ==
- National Register of Historic Places listings in El Paso County, Colorado
