= Colorado College =

Private college in Colorado Springs, Colorado, US

- Other name: The Colorado College
- Motto: Scientia et Disciplina (Latin)
- Motto in English: "Learning through Hard Work"
- Type: Private liberal arts college
- Established: 1874; 152 years ago
- Accreditation: Higher Learning Commission
- Affiliations: Nonsectarian (since 1907)
- Endowment: $1.06 billion (2025)
- President: Manya Whitaker
- Academic staff: 281 (Note: Instructional faculty) (2025)
- Total staff: 783 (Note: Faculty and staff) (2023)
- Students: 2,056 (2025)
- Undergraduates: 2,031 (2025)
- Postgraduates: 25 (2025)
- Location: Colorado Springs, Colorado, United States; 38.8479°N 104.8228°W
- Campus: 90 acres (36 ha); Urban
- Colors: Black & gold
- Nickname: Tigers
- Sporting affiliations: NCAA Division III –: SCAC; NCHC (Note: Conference for men's ice hockey, which competes at D-I); MWC (Note: Conference for women's soccer, which competes at D-I)
- Mascot: RoCCy
- Website: coloradocollege.edu/

Colorado College is a private liberal arts college in Colorado Springs, Colorado, United States. Founded in 1874 by Thomas Nelson Haskell in his daughter's memory, the college offers 42 majors and 54 minors, and enrolls approximately 2,000 undergraduates at its 90-acre (36 ha) campus.

Colorado College is a member of the Associated Colleges of the Midwest, and is a QuestBridge partner. Notable alumni include Diana DeGette, Liz Cheney, Dutch Clark, Thomas Hornsby Ferril, James Heckman, Steve Sabol, Ken Salazar, and Marc Webb. Most of the university's varsity sports teams compete in NCAA Division III, with the exception of Division I teams in men's hockey and women's soccer.

== History ==
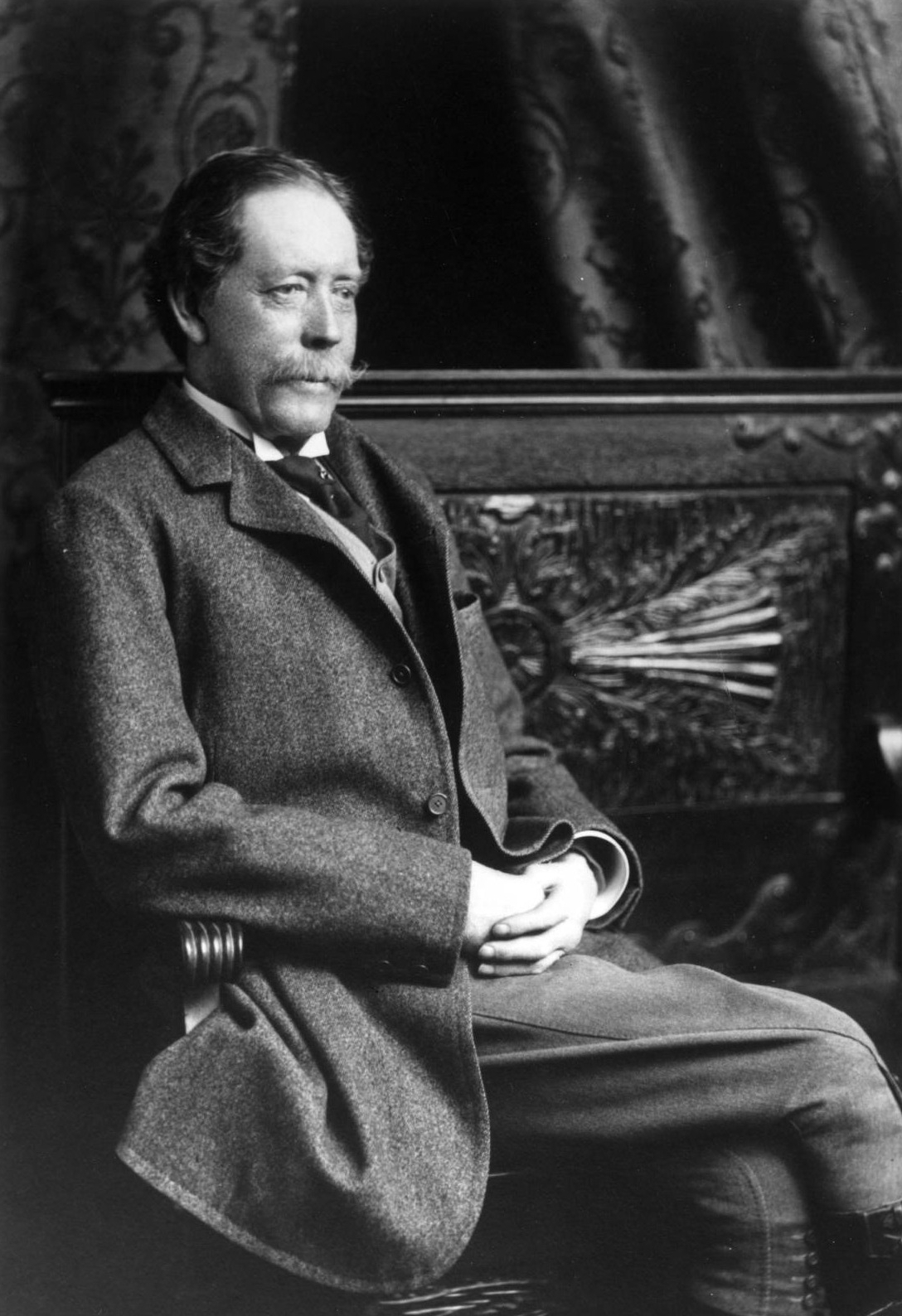
William Jackson Palmer, founder of Colorado Springs and founding trustee of Colorado College

Colorado College was founded in 1874 on land designated by U.S. Civil War veteran General William Jackson Palmer, the founder of the Denver and Rio Grande Railroad and of Colorado Springs. Founder Thomas Nelson Haskell of the Presbyterian Church described it as a coeducational liberal arts college in the tradition of Oberlin College. As many U.S. colleges and universities that have endured from the 19th century, it now is secular in outlook but retains its focus on the liberal arts.

Cutler Hall, the college's first building, was completed in 1880 and the first degrees were conferred in 1882.

William F. Slocum, president from 1888 to 1917, oversaw the initial building of the campus, expanded the library and recruited top scholars in a number of fields. In 1930, Shove Chapel was erected by John Gray to meet the religious needs of the students (though Colorado College is not religiously affiliated).

Katharine Lee Bates wrote "America the Beautiful" during her summer teaching position at Colorado College in 1893.

Manya Whitaker served as interim president from July 1, 2024 through June 30, 2025. Her term as president began July 1, 2025 after being appointed as the college's 15th president by the CC Board of Trustees in June 2025.

== Academics ==
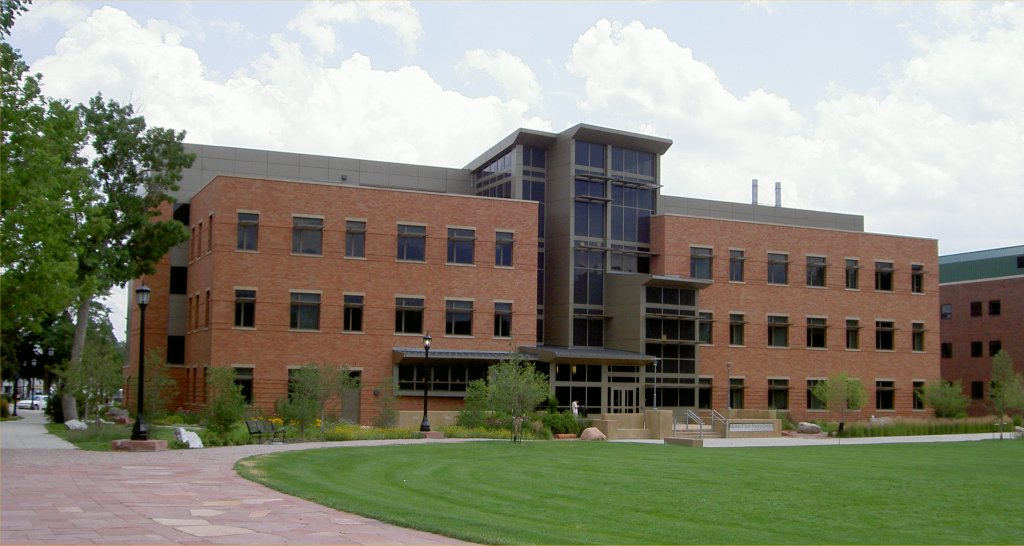
Russell T. Tutt Science Center at Colorado College

Colorado College offers 42 majors and 54 minors. In addition to its undergraduate programs, the college offers two master's degree programs in teaching. The college uses a block plan wherein students take only one class at a time, for a period of 3 and a half weeks per class. In 2026, the institution yielded a student-to-faculty ratio of 7.6:1. The college's Charles L. Tutt Library holds over 400 thousand physical volumes. Its most popular undergraduate majors, by 2025 graduates, were:

Business, Economics, and Society (45)
Computer Science (42)
Political Science (38)
Psychology (34)
Organismal Biology & Ecology (33)
Molecular Biology (31)
Neuroscience (27)

=== Admissions ===
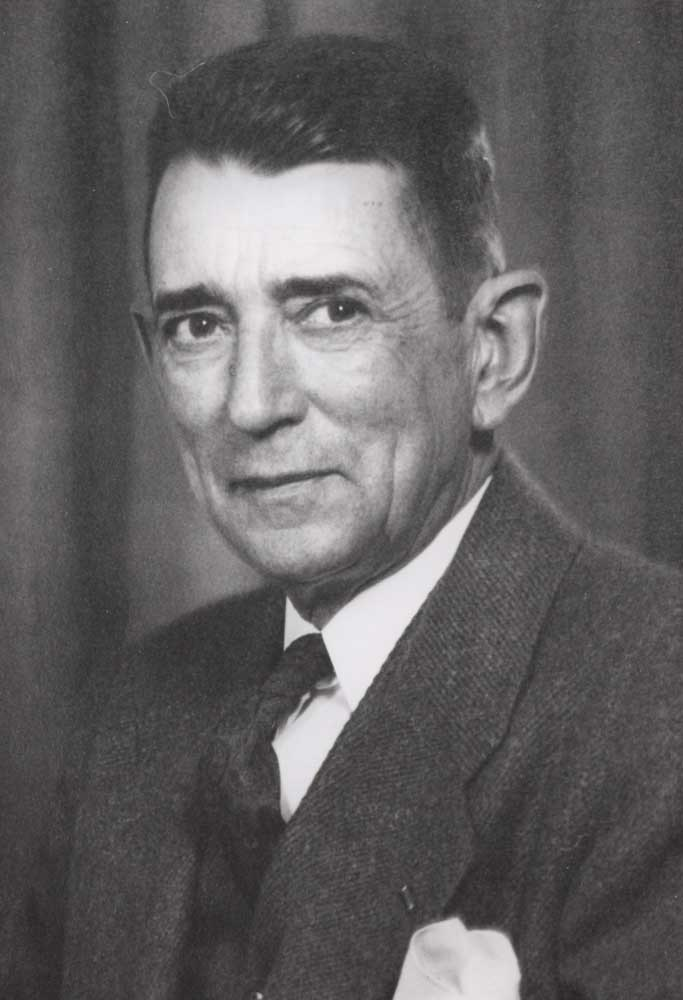
Major general William H. Gill served as President of Colorado College 1947–1955..

Colorado College is considered a "most selective school" by U.S. News & World Report. For the class of 2026, Colorado College received a record number of applications, 11,026, and admitted just above eleven percent of those who applied. Those accepted who identified themselves as students of color numbered twenty-five percent. The Class of 2026 is geographically diverse, representing 15 countries and 47 states, with 24 percent who hail from both the Northeast and the West; 17 percent from Colorado; 16 percent from the Midwest; and 15 percent from the South.

=== Rankings ===
Academic rankings

Liberal arts
- U.S. News & World Report: 29
- Washington Monthly: 86

National
- Forbes: 111
- WSJ/College Pulse: 111

In its 2025 edition, U.S. News & World Report ranks Colorado College as tied for 29th best liberal arts college in the nation and 3rd most innovative national liberal arts colleges. The most innovative schools are those "making the most innovative improvements in terms of curriculum, faculty, students, campus life, technology or facilities".

In 2025, Forbes rated it 111th overall in "America's Top Colleges", which ranked 500 national universities, liberal arts colleges and service academies.

CC is one of six colleges in the western US included in the guidebook The Hidden Ivies.

=== Requirements ===
Students must satisfactorily complete 32 credits to graduate in addition to specifying a major of study and fulfilling those requirements. The college offers a unique alternative for students who wish to design their own major. However, standardized cross-cutting requirements still apply, though these criteria are fairly broad compared to those at comparable colleges.

== Student life ==
The college's motto is the Latin phrase Scientia et Disciplina, translated as "Learning through Hard Work" or "Acquiring Knowledge and Living It". Tuition for the 2026-2027 academic year is $75,702. The median family income of Colorado College students is $277,500, the highest of any college or university in the United States, with 54% of students coming from the top 5% highest-earning families and 10.5% from the bottom 60%.

=== Extracurriculars ===
The small campus of 2,000 students boasts more than one hundred clubs and student groups, ranging from professional groups, interests clubs, and social groups. Among them are intramural sports groups, which have a strong presence on campus. There are intramural teams, ranging from broomball to ultimate frisbee.

==== Student newspaper ====
The Catalyst is a weekly newspaper published by students of Colorado College on Friday mornings during the first three weeks of each block of the school year. It is the official and only student paper at the school and has a print circulation of roughly 1,500 circulated on the college's campus and in downtown Colorado Springs. The Catalyst consists of five sections: News, Sports, Features, Arts & Entertainment, and Opinion. It has been in print since the 1890s, and has undergone dozens of transformations over the years. The newspaper was originally called The Tiger.

=== Housing ===
Most students live on or directly adjacent to the college campus. Up until their junior year, students are required to live on campus in one of the residence halls or small houses, while apartments and student-owned cottages are available to upperclassmen.

== Campus ==
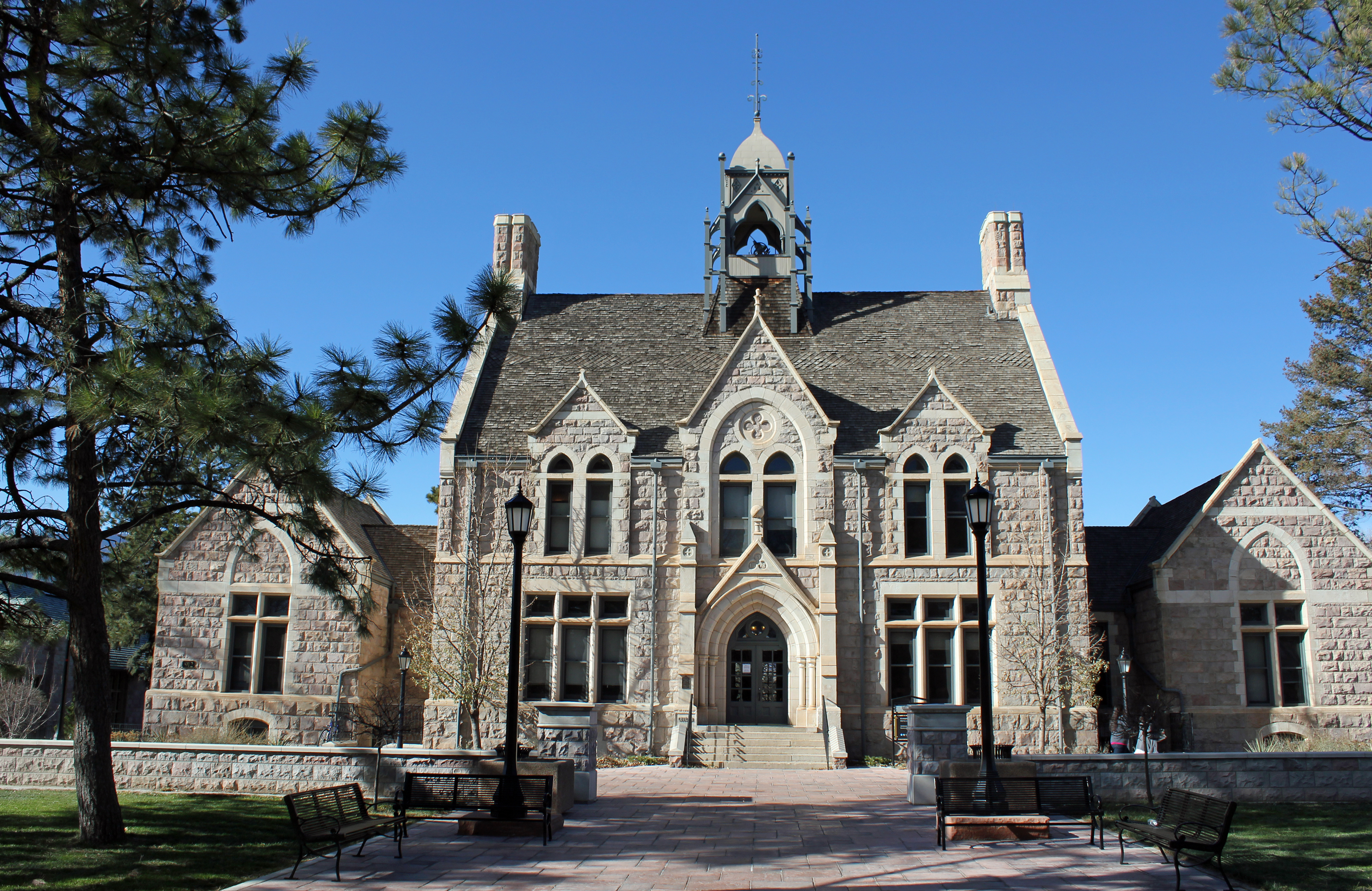
Cutler Hall, located at 912 North Cascade Avenue, on the Colorado College campus, in Colorado Springs, Colorado. The property is listed on the National Register of Historic Places.

Many of the earliest campus buildings, including Bemis, Cossitt, Cutler, McGregor, Montgomery, Palmer, and Ticknor Halls, are on the National Register of Historic Places, along with Shove Memorial Chapel and the William I. Spencer Center. Arthur House or Edgeplain, once home to the son of President Chester A. Arthur, is also on the National Register.

Since the mid-1950s, newer facilities include three large residence halls, Worner Campus Center, Olin Hall of Science and the Barnes Science Center, Honnen Ice Rink, Boettcher Health Center, Schlessman Pool, Armstrong Hall of Humanities, and the El Pomar Sports Center. The face of campus changed again at the beginning of the 21st century with construction of the Western Ridge Housing Complex, which offers apartment-style living for upper-division students and completion of the Russell T. Tutt Science Center. The east campus has been expanded, and is now home to the Greek Quad and several small residence halls known as "theme houses".

Some of the more recent notable buildings include Tutt Library, designed by Skidmore, Owings & Merrill and later expanded and renovated by Pfeiffer Partners to be the largest carbon-neutral academic library in the United States, Packard Hall of Music and Art, designed by Edward Larrabee Barnes, and the Edith Kinney Gaylord Cornerstone Arts Center, which was designed by Antoine Predock with input from faculty and students.

Edith Kinney Gaylord Cornerstone Arts Center at Colorado College

=== Edith Kinney Gaylord Cornerstone Arts Center ===
Colorado College's Edith Kinney Gaylord Cornerstone Arts Center, completed in 2008 and located at the intersection of a performing arts corridor in Colorado Springs, is home to the college's film, drama and dance departments and contains a large theater, several smaller performance spaces, a screening room, the I.D.E.A. Space gallery, and classrooms, among other rooms. The building also meets the second highest level of LEED certification.

=== Ed Robson Arena ===
The Ed Robson Arena is a 3,400-seat ice hockey arena on the campus of Colorado College. The arena opened on September 18 2021. Plans for a school-run arena date as far back as 2008 in the Colorado College Long Range Development Plan.

== Athletics ==
Map of CC

The school's sports teams are nicknamed the "Tigers". Colorado College competes at the NCAA Division III level in all sports except men's hockey, in which it participates in the NCAA Division I National Collegiate Hockey Conference, and women's soccer, where it competes as an NCAA Division I team in the Mountain West Conference. CC dropped its intercollegiate athletic programs in football, softball, and women's water polo following the 2008–09 academic year.

In 1994, a student referendum to change the athletic teams' nicknames to the Cutthroat trout narrowly failed, by a margin of 468–423.

The Tigers hockey team won the NCAA Division I championship twice (1950, 1957), were runners up three times (1952, 1955, 1996) and have made the NCAA Tournament eighteen times, including eleven times since 1995. In 1996, 1997, and 2005, CC played in the Frozen Four, finishing second in 1996. Fifty-five CC Tigers have been named All-Americans. Hockey Hall of Fame coach Bob Johnson coached the Tigers from 1963 to 1966.

The current hockey coach is Kris Mayotte, who had been an assistant coach at Providence College and the University of Michigan.

== Notable people ==
Colorado College has graduated a Nobel Prize winner, a Pulitzer Prize winner, 2 MacArthur Fellows, 14 Rhodes Scholars, 31 Fulbright Scholars, 68 Watson Fellows, winners of Academy Awards, Emmy Awards, and Grammy Awards, and Olympic medallists. Alumni include Liz Cheney, Peggy Fleming, Steve Sabol, William A. Welch, Frederick Madison Roberts, and Abdul Aziz Abdul Ghani. Board members include Robert J. Ross, France Winddance Twine, and alumni Frieda Ekotto and Joe Ellis. Life Trustees include David M. Lampton and alumnus Neal A. Baer. Honorary Trustees include alumni Lynne Cheney, Diana DeGette, and Ken Salazar. CC has also graduated 18 Olympians and 170 professional hockey players, including over 30 current and former NHL players. Notable faculty and staff include Dick Celeste and Jill Tiefenthaler.
