= HMT Empire Windrush =

Passenger liner and cruise ship

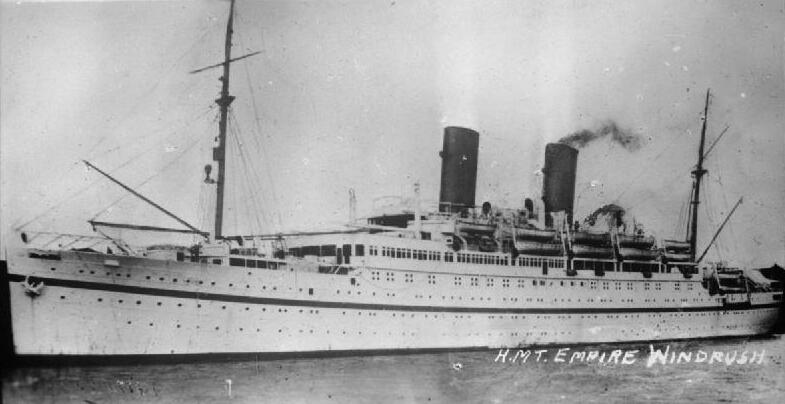
- Empire Windrush

History
- Name: 1930: Monte Rosa; 1947: Empire Windrush
- Namesake: 1930: Monte Rosa; 1947: River Windrush
- Owner: 1931: Hamburg Süd; 1947: Ministry of Transport
- Operator: 1940: Kriegsmarine; 1947: New Zealand Shipping Co
- Port of registry: 1931: (Weimar Republic) Hamburg; 1947: (United Kingdom) London
- Route: 1931: Hamburg – Buenos Aires
- Builder: Blohm+Voss, Hamburg
- Yard number: 492
- Launched: 13 December 1930
- Maiden voyage: 28 March – 30 June 1931
- Identification: 1931: German official number 1640; 1931: code letters RHWF; by 1934: call sign DIDU; 1947: UK official number 181561; 1947: call sign GYSF
- Fate: Caught fire and sank, 1954

General characteristics
- Class & type: Monte-class passenger ship
- Tonnage: 1931: 13,882 GRT, 7,788 NRT; 1947: 14,414 GRT, 8,193 NRT
- Length: 500.3 ft (152.5 m)
- Beam: 65.7 ft (20.0 m)
- Draught: 26 ft 4 1/2 in (8.04 m)
- Depth: 37.8 ft (11.5 m)
- Decks: 4
- Installed power: 6,880 bhp (5,130 kW)
- Propulsion: 4 × 6-cylinder Diesel engines; single-reduction gearing, 2 × screw propellers
- Speed: 14 knots (26 km/h)
- Crew: 222
- Sensors & processing systems: 1931: submarine signalling; by 1934: wireless direction finding; gyrocompass; by 1947: radar
- Notes: sister ships: Monte Olivia, Monte Sarmiento, Monte Cervantes, Monte Pascoal

HMT Empire Windrush was a passenger motor ship that was launched in Germany in 1930 as the MV Monte Rosa. She was built as an ocean liner for the German shipping company Hamburg Süd. They used the ship to carry German emigrants to South America, and as a cruise ship. During World War II, she was taken over by the German navy and used as a troopship. During the war, she survived two Allied attempts to sink her.

After World War II, the United Kingdom seized the ship as a prize of war and renamed her HMT Empire Windrush. She remained in British service as a troopship until 1954.

In June 1948, Empire Windrush arrived at the Port of Tilbury near London, carrying 1,027 passengers and two stowaways who embarked at Trinidad, Jamaica, Mexico and Bermuda. The passengers included people from many parts of the world but the great majority were West Indian.

Empire Windrush was not the first ship to carry a large group of West Indian people to the United Kingdom as two other ships (the SS Ormonde and the SS Almanzora) had arrived the previous year. But her 1948 voyage became very well-known and a symbol of post-war migration to Britain. British Caribbean people who came to the United Kingdom in the period after World War II, including those who came on other ships, are often referred to as the Windrush generation.

On 28 March 1954, while in the western Mediterranean Sea, a sudden explosion and fire in Windrush's engine room killed four people. The fire could not be controlled and the ship was abandoned; the other 1494 passengers and crew were all rescued. The empty ship remained afloat and on-fire for nearly two days, eventually sinking during an attempt to salvage her.

== Background and description ==
Monte Rosa, was the last of five almost identical Monte-class passenger ships that were built between 1924 and 1931 by Blohm & Voss in Hamburg for Hamburg Süd (Hamburg South American Steam Shipping Company).

In the 1920s Hamburg Süd believed there would be a lucrative business in carrying German emigrants to South America (see "German Argentines"). The first two ships, Monte Sarmiento and Monte Olivia, were built for that trade with single-class passenger accommodation of 1,150 passengers in cabins, and 1,350 in dormitories. However, the number of emigrants was less than expected so the two ships were repurposed as cruise ships, operating in Northern European waters, the Mediterranean and around South America. This venture became a great success.

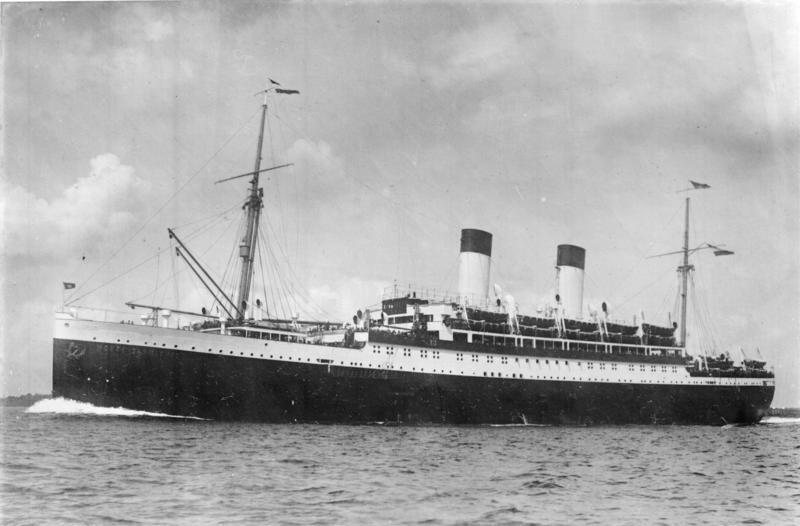
Monte Cervantes, one of Monte Rosa's sister ships, 1930

Until the 1920s, cruise holidays had been the preserve of the very wealthy. But by providing modestly priced cruises, Hamburg Süd could profitably attract a large new clientele. The company commissioned another ship, Monte Cervantes, to meet the increased demand. But she sank after only two years' service when she struck an uncharted rock in the Beagle Channel. Hamburg Süd then ordered two more ships: Monte Pascoal and Monte Rosa.

Monte Rosa's registered length was 500.3 ft (152.5 m), her beam was 65.7 ft (20.0 m), her depth was 37.8 ft (11.5 m), and her draught was 26 ft 4 1/2 in (8.04 m). Her tonnages were 13,882 GRT and 7,788 NRT.

=== Engines and machinery ===
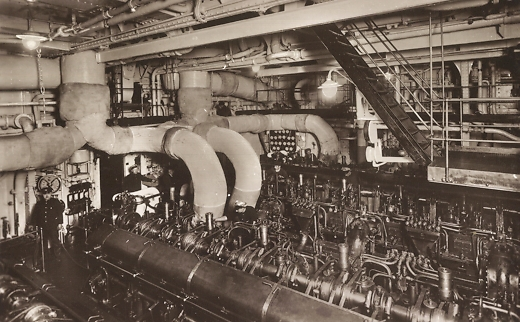
Monte Cervantes' engine room

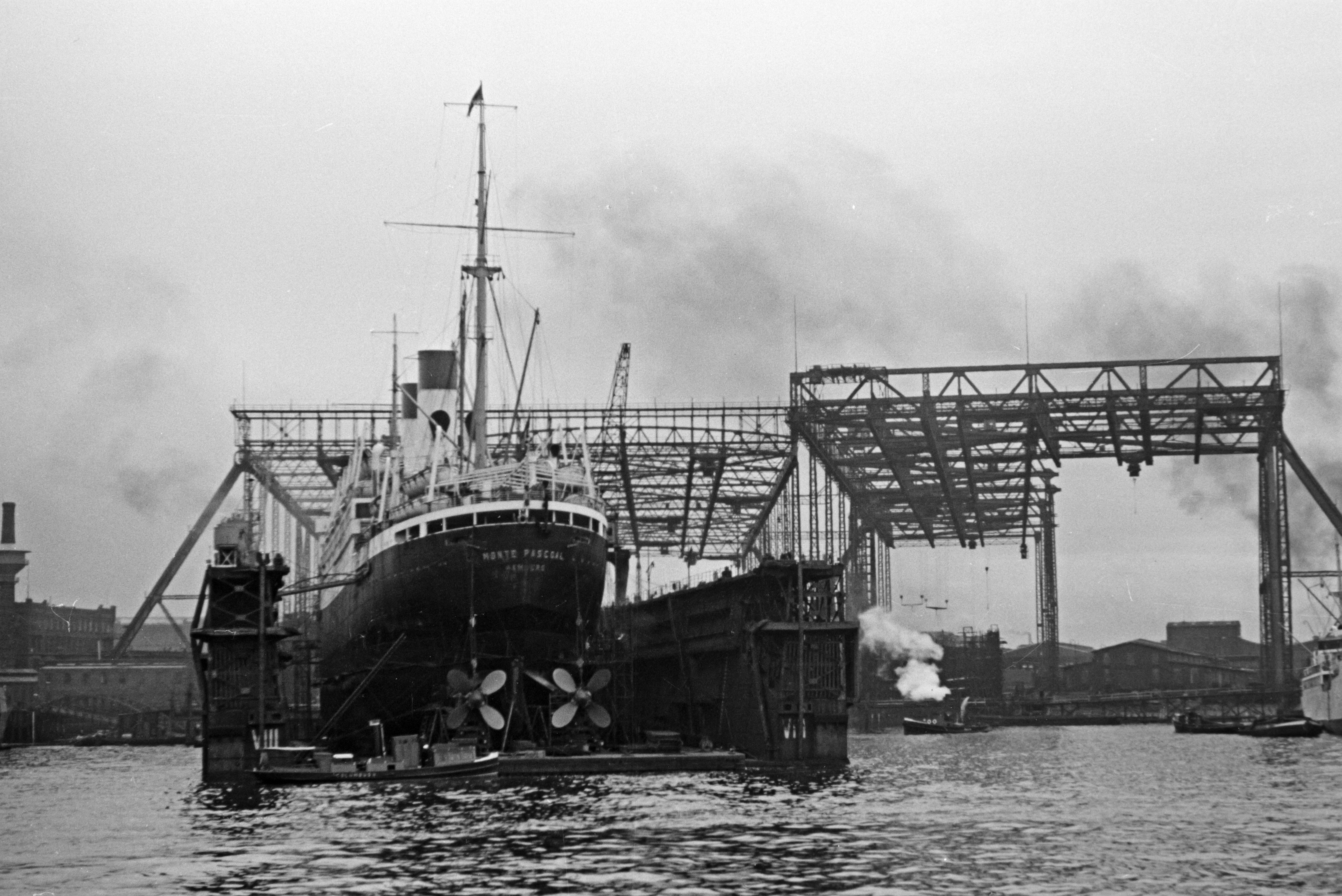
Monte Rosa's sister-ship Monte Pascoal, on a floating dry-dock in the mid-1930s. The ship's two propellers can be seen

All five Monte-class ships were motor ships. The first two to be launched, Monte Sarmiento and Monte Olivia, were the first large Diesel-powered passenger ships to serve with a German operator. The use of diesel engines drew on the experience Blohm & Voss had gained by building diesel-powered U-boats in World War I.

Windrush had a set of four four-stroke, six-cylinder, single-acting MAN Diesel engines. She had two screw propellers, each of which was driven by one pair of engines via single-reduction gearing. Her engines' combined output was rated at 6,880 brake horsepower (5,130 kW), and gave her a speed of 14 knots (26 km/h). This was slower than Hamburg Süd's flagship Cap Arcona, but more economical for the emigrant trade, and for pleasure cruises.

Electric power was supplied by a set of DC electric generators, powered by internal combustion engines in the engine room. As built, Monte Rosa had three 350 kW generators. A fourth generator was added in 1949. She had also an emergency generator outside the engine room. The ship also carried two Scotch marine boilers to produce high-pressure steam for some auxiliary machinery. These could be heated either by burning diesel fuel, or by using the hot exhaust gases from her main engines.

== Naming and registration ==
The Monte-class ships were named after mountains in Europe or South America. Monte Rosa was named after Monte Rosa, which is a mountain massif on the Swiss-Italian border, and is the second-highest mountain in the Alps. Hamburg Süd registered her at Hamburg. Her German official number was 1640, and her code letters were RHWF. By 1934 her call sign was DIDU, and this had superseded her code letters.

Under UK ownership she became one of about 1,300 Empire ships. About 60 Empire ships were named after British rivers. (Note: Adur, Arun, Blackwater, Bure, Calder, Chelmer, Cherwell, Clyde, Colne, Crouch, Dart, Dee, Derwent, Don, Dovey, Evenlode, Exe, Fal, Frome, Hamble, Humber, Kennet, Lune, Nene, Nidd, Orwell, Ouse, Otter, Ribble, Roden, Roding, Rother, Severn, Soar, Spey, Stour, Swale, Taff, Tamar, Taw, Tern, Teviot, Thames, Torridge, Trent, Tweed, Tyne, Usk, Wandle, Wansbeck, Waveney, Weaver, Welland, Wensum, Wey, Wharfe, Windrush, Witham, Wye, Yare.) Her namesake, the River Windrush, rises in the Cotswolds, and joins the River Thames a few miles upstream of Oxford. The Ministry of Transport registered her at London. Her UK official number was 181561, and her call sign was GYSF.

In UK service, her name had the prefix "HMT" which could stand for "His Majesty's Troopship", "His Majesty's Transport" or "Hired Military Transport". (Note: Royal Navy armed trawlers also used the prefix HMT, in this case meaning "His/Her Majesty's Trawler".) Some official documents, including the enquiry report into the ship's loss, use "MV" (which stands for Motor Vessel), instead of "HMT".

== German merchant service ==
Blohm & Voss launched Monte Rosa on 13 December 1930. Early in 1931 she made her sea trials and was delivered to Hamburg Süd. Her maiden voyage was from Hamburg to Buenos Aires. She left Hamburg on 28 March 1931, and got back on 22 June. For the remainder of 1931, all four Monte sisters were scheduled to sail between Hamburg and Buenos Aires. They were scheduled to call at A Coruña and Vigo on outward voyages only; and to call at Las Palmas, Rio de Janeiro, Santos, São Francisco do Sul, Rio Grande, and Montevideo in both directions.

Monte Rosa entered service just as the Great Depression was causing a global slump in shipping, including Hamburg Süd's passenger business. In 1933 trade began to recover, so Hamburg Süd returned the older ships, Monte Sarmiento and Monte Olivia, to their original role of taking emigrants to South America; and put Monte Pascoal and Monte Rosa mainly on cruises to Norway and the UK. By 1935 Monte Rosa was back on her route between Hamburg and Buenos Aires. She made more than 20 round trips on the route before the outbreak of World War II.

After coming to power in Germany in 1933, the Nazi Party used ships including Monte Rosa to further its ideology. In 1937 the Nazi government chartered Monte Olivia, Monte Rosa, and Monte Sarmiento to provide cruise holidays for the state-owned Kraft durch Freude ("Strength through Joy") programme. This provided concerts, lectures, sports activities and cheap holidays as a means of strengthening support for the Nazi regime and indoctrinating people in its ideology. The cruises ranged from eight to 20 days in duration. One route went north from Hamburg, along the Norwegian coast and travelling as far as Svalbard. Another was through the Mediterranean, stopping in Italy and Libya, and travelling as far east as Port Said. Each voyage included a number of undercover Gestapo officers, tasked with spying on the passengers.

When visiting South America, the ship was used to spread Nazi ideology among the German-speaking community there. When in port in Argentina, she hosted Nazi rallies for German Argentines. In 1933, the new German ambassador, Baron Edmond von Thermann, sailed to Argentina aboard Monte Rosa. He disembarked wearing an SS uniform in front of an enthusiastic crowd. He spent his time in office promoting Nazi ideology. The ship was also a venue for Nazi gatherings when docked in London.

On 23 July 1934 Monte Rosa ran aground off Thorshavn in the Faroe Islands. She was refloated the next day. In 1936 she rendezvoused at sea with the airship LZ 127 Graf Zeppelin, and a bottle of Champagne was hoisted from her deck to the airship.

== World War II service ==
When World War II began, Monte Rosa was in Hamburg. From 11 January 1940 she was a barracks ship at Stettin (now Szczecin), and in April 1940 she was a troopship for the invasion of Norway, mainly sailing to Oslo.

She was one of two ships used in 1942 to deport Norwegian Jews. She made two trips from Oslo to Denmark on 19 and 26 November, carrying a total of 46 Jewish people, including the Polish-Norwegian businessman and humanitarian Moritz Rabinowitz. All but two were murdered at Auschwitz concentration camp. In September 1943 she was to be used for the deportation of Danish Jews. The German chief of sea transport at Aarhus in Denmark, together with Monte Rosa's captain, Heinrich Bertram (captain), conspired to prevent this by falsely reporting serious engine trouble to the German High Command. This action may have helped the rescue of the Danish Jews.

In September 1943, Royal Navy X-class submarines in Operation Source badly damaged the battleship Tirpitz in Altafjord in Norway. Germany was unwilling to risk moving the ship to a German dockyard for repair, so in October Monte Rosa was used to take hundreds of civilian workers and engineers to Altafjord, where they repaired Tirpitz in situ. Monte Rosa was docked alongside Tirpitz as an accommodation ship for the workers, and as a repair ship.

=== Air attack ===
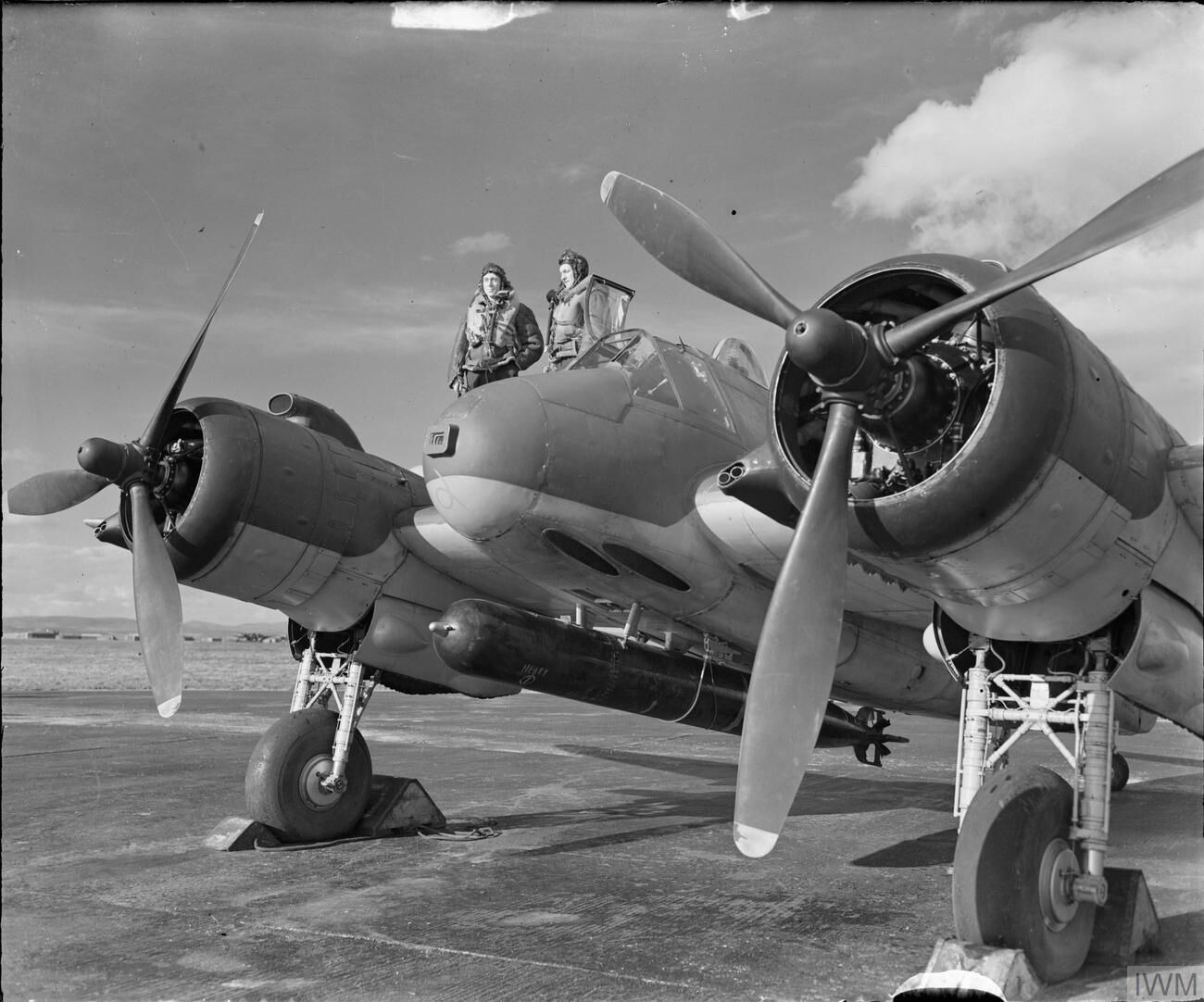
A torpedo-equipped Bristol Beaufighter of 144 Squadron, an aircraft of the type the squadron used to attack Monte Rosa

During the winter of 1943–1944, Monte Rosa continued to sail between Norway and Germany. On 30 March 1944, British and Canadian Bristol Beaufighters attacked her. The strike was planned to sink her, after a reconnaissance aircraft of 333 (Norwegian) Squadron had tracked her movements. The ship was sailing south, escorted by two flak ships; a destroyer; and German fighter aircraft. The attacking force comprised nine aircraft of Royal Air Force (RAF) 144 Squadron, five of which carried torpedoes; and nine aircraft of Royal Canadian Air Force (RCAF) 404 Squadron, all armed with armour-piercing RP-3 rockets.

The attack was near the Norwegian island of Utsira. The RCAF and RAF crews claimed two torpedo hits on Monte Rosa. Cannon fire and eight rockets also hit her. One German Messerschmitt Bf 110 fighter was shot down, and 404 Squadron lost two Beaufighters. The two crew of one aircraft were killed; the crew of the other (one of whom was the squadron commanding officer) survived and were made prisoners of war. Despite her damage, Monte Rosa reached Aarhus in Denmark on 3 April.

=== Sabotage attack ===
In June 1944, Max Manus and Gregers Gram, members of Norwegian Independent Company 1 (a British Army sabotage and resistance unit composed of Norwegians), attached limpet mines to Monte Rosa's hull while she was in Oslo harbour. The British had learned the ship was to take 3,000 German troops back to Germany. The raid's purpose was to sink her during the voyage. The pair twice bluffed their way into the dock area by posing as electricians, then hid for three days as they waited for the ship to arrive. After she docked, they paddled out to her in an inflatable rubber boat and attached their mines. The mines detonated when the ship was near Øresund. They damaged her hull, but she stayed afloat, and returned to harbour under her own power. (Note: Max Manus had more success seven months later, in January 1945, when he and Roy Nielsen sank the SS Donau. They used the same form of attack - placing limpet mines on the ship while docked in Oslo harbour. The Donnau was a German troopship and was the other vessel used in the deportation of Norwegian Jewish people.)

=== Further war damage ===
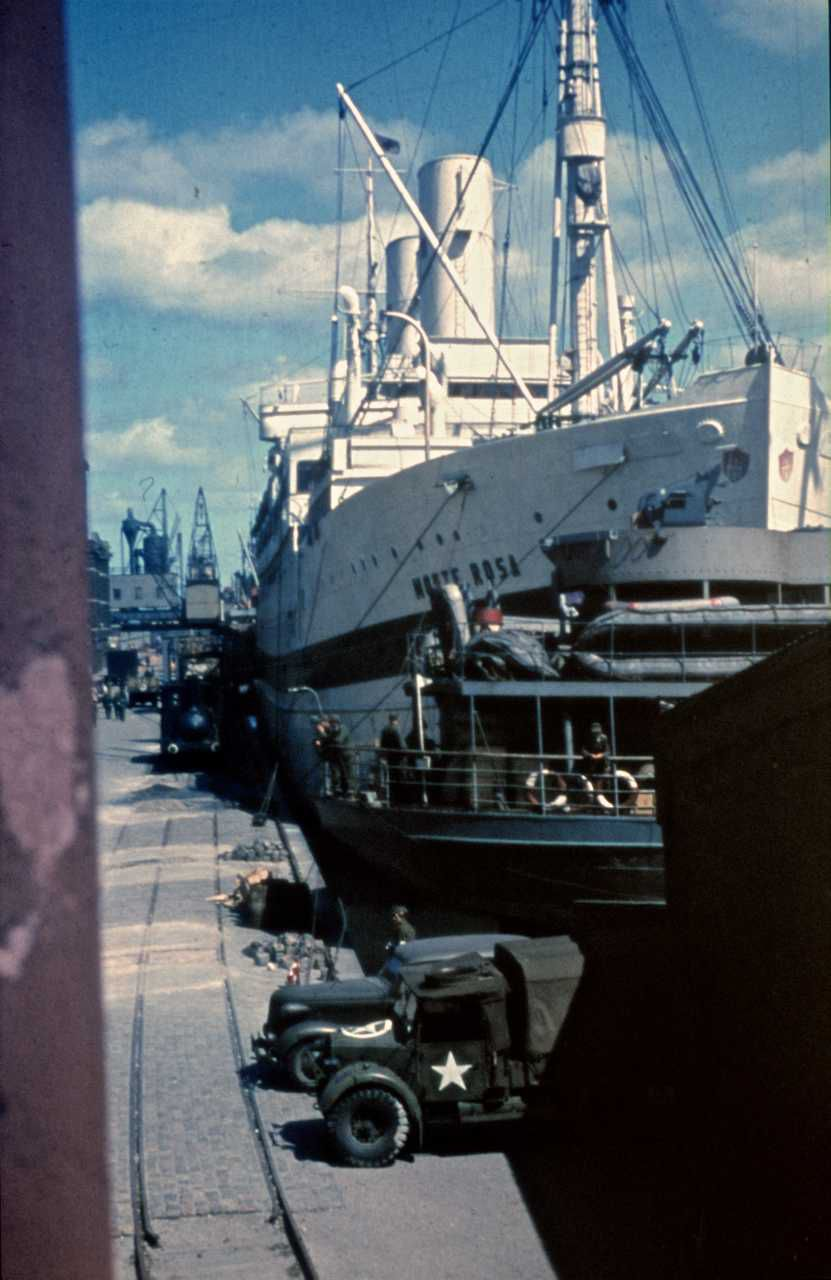
Monte Rosa with refugees in the Freeport of Copenhagen. Photographed after the British liberation in May 1945.

In September 1944 another explosion, possibly by a mine, damaged Monte Rosa. Odd Claus, a Norwegian boy with German parents who was being forcibly taken to Germany, was one of those aboard when it happened. In his memoirs, published on 2008, he wrote that the ship was carrying German troops, plus Norwegian women with young children, who were being taken to Germany as part of the Lebensborn programme. The explosion was at 0500 hrs, and about 200 people aboard were trapped and drowned as the ship's captain closed the watertight bulkhead doors to limit flooding and keep the ship afloat.

On 16 February 1945 a mine explosion near the Hel Peninsula in the Baltic damaged Monte Rosa, flooding her engine room. She was towed to Gdynia for temporary repairs. She was then towed to Copenhagen, carrying 5,000 German refugees fleeing from the advancing Red Army. She was then taken to Kiel, where on 10 May 1945 British forces captured her.

== UK service ==
In summer 1945 a Danish dockyard repaired Monte Rosa's war damage. On 18 November 1945, ownership was transferred to the UK as a prize of war. In 1946 she was refitted at South Shields as a troopship. On 21 January 1947 she was renamed HMT Empire Windrush. She was registered as a UK merchant ship, and assigned to the UK Ministry of Transport, who contracted The New Zealand Shipping Company to manage her.

By then she was the only survivor of the five Monte-class ships. Monte Cervantes sank near Tierra del Fuego in 1930. Two members of the class were sunk in Kiel harbour by separate wartime air-raids, Monte Sarmiento in February 1942 and Monte Olivia in April 1945. Monte Pascoal was damaged by an air raid on Wilhelmshaven in February 1944. In 1946 she was filled with chemical bombs, and the British scuttled her in the Skagerrak.

As a troopship, Empire Windrush made 13 round trips between Britain and the Far East. Her route was between Southampton and Hong Kong, via Gibraltar; Suez; Aden; Colombo; and Singapore. Her route was extended to Kure in Japan during the Korean War. She also made ten round trips to the Mediterranean; four to India; and one to the West Indies.

=== West Indian migrants ===
In 1948, Empire Windrush travelled from the United Kingdom to the Caribbean, to repatriate around 500 West Indians who had served in the Royal Air Force during World War II. She was also carrying 257 civilians, including women and children. The officer in charge of the servicemen was Sierra Leonean Flight Lieutenant John Henry Clavell Smythe. He later became Attorney General of Sierra Leone. With him on the voyage was Flight Lieutenant John Jellicoe Blair from Jamaica. The ship departed from Southampton on 7 May and arrived in Trinidad on 20 May. She then stopped at Kingston, Jamaica, Tampico, Mexico, Havana, Cuba and Bermuda, before returning to the United Kingdom. (Note: Some sources state Windrush was travelling back to the United Kingdom from Australia, via the Panama Canal. But in fact the ship never transited the canal during her career and never visited Australia.)

Advert in the Jamaican newspaper, The Daily Gleaner, 15th April, 1948

Several weeks before the ship left the United Kingdom, opportunistic advertisements had been placed in a Jamaican newspaper, The Daily Gleaner, offering cheap passage on the ship's return voyage; advertisements were also placed in newspapers in British Honduras, British Guiana, Trinidad and Tobago and other places. However, the cheapest fares were only available to men, who were accommodated in the large, dormitory areas usually allocated to troops. Women were required to travel in the ship's two and four-berth cabins, that cost considerably more.

Many former servicemen took this opportunity to return to Britain in hope of finding better employment. Some wished to rejoin the RAF. Others decided to make the journey just to see what the "mother country" was like. One passenger later recalled that demand for tickets far exceeded supply, and there was a long queue to buy one.

The British Nationality Bill to give the status of citizenship of the United Kingdom and Colonies (CUKC status) to all British subjects connected with the United Kingdom or a British colony, was going through Parliament. Some Caribbean migrants decided to embark in anticipation that the bill would become an Act of Parliament. Until 1962, the UK had no immigration control for CUKCs. They could settle in the UK indefinitely, without restriction.

==== Passengers aboard ====
A figure often given for the number of West Indian migrants aboard Empire Windrush is 492, based on news reports in the media at the time, which variously announced that "more than 400", "430" or "500" Jamaican men had arrived in Britain. However, the ship's manifest, kept in the United Kingdom National Archives, shows that 802 passengers gave their last place of residence as a country in the Caribbean.

Among Caribbean passengers was Jamaican-born Sam Beaver King, who was travelling to the UK to rejoin the RAF. He later helped to found the Notting Hill Carnival, and became the first black Mayor of Southwark. The Jamaican artist and master potter Cecil Baugh was also aboard. There were a number of musicians who were later to become well known. These included the Calypso musicians Lord Kitchener, Lord Beginner and Lord Woodbine, all from Trinidad; the Jamaican jazz trumpeter Dizzy Reece and the Trinidadian singer Mona Baptiste, one of the few women on the ship, who travelled first class. A small number of the Caribbean people aboard were Indo-Caribbeans. One of whom, Sikaram Gopthal, was the father of the record-label owner Lee Gopthal.

There were also 66 Polish passengers who embarked when the ship called at Tampico, Mexico. They were women and children whom the Soviets had deported to Siberia after the Soviet invasion of Poland in 1939, but who had escaped and travelled via India and the Pacific to Mexico. About 1,400 had been living at a refugee camp at Santa Rosa near León, Guanajuato since 1943. They were granted permission to settle in the UK under the Polish Resettlement Act 1947. One of them later recalled that they were given cabins below the waterline, allowed on deck only in escorted groups, and kept segregated from the other passengers.

Of the other passengers, 119 were from the UK, and 40 from elsewhere in the world. Non-Caribbean people aboard included Nancy Cunard, English writer and heiress to the Cunard shipping fortune; the travel writer Freya Stark (who shared a cabin with Cunard); Lady Ivy Woolley, the wife of Sir Charles Woolley, the governor of British Guiana; Gertrude Whitelaw, the wealthy widow of the former Member of Parliament William Whitelaw (Note: Gertrude Whitelaw was the grandmother of the prominent Conservative politician William Whitelaw, 1st Viscount Whitelaw); and Peter Jonas, who was only two years old and travelling with his mother and older sister. He would be later well known as an arts administrator and opera company director.

One of the stowaways was a woman called Evelyn Wauchope, a 27-year-old dressmaker. She was discovered seven days out of Kingston. Some of the musicians on-board organised a benefit concert that raised enough money for her fare, and £4 spending money. (Note: Wauchope got married in Britain in 1952. She and her husband moved to the United States in 1954.)

==== Arrival ====
Empire Windrush's arrival became a news event. When she was in the English Channel, the Evening Standard sent an aircraft to photograph her from the air, and published the story on its front page. She docked at Tilbury, downriver from London, on 21 June 1948, and the 1,027 passengers began disembarking the next day. This was covered by newspaper reporters and by Pathé News newsreel cameras. The name Windrush, as a result, has come to be used as a synecdoche for West Indian migration, and, by extension, for the beginning of modern British multiracial society.

The purpose of Empire Windrush's voyage to the Caribbean had been to repatriate service personnel. The UK government neither expected nor welcomed her return with civilian, West Indian migrants. Three days before the ship arrived, Arthur Creech Jones, the Secretary of State for the Colonies, wrote a Cabinet memorandum noting that the Jamaican Government could not legally stop people from leaving, and the UK government could not legally stop them from landing. However, he stated that the Government was opposed to this migration, and both the Colonial Office and the Jamaican government would take all possible steps to discourage it.

The day after arrival, several MPs, including James Dixon Murray, warned the Prime Minister that such an "argosy of Jamaicans", might "cause discord and unhappiness among all concerned". George Isaacs, the Minister of Labour, stated in Parliament that there would be no encouragement for others to follow their example. Despite this, Parliament did not pass the first legislation controlling immigration from the Commonwealth until 1962.

Passengers who had not already arranged accommodation were temporarily housed in the Clapham South deep shelter in southwest London, less than a mile away from the Coldharbour Lane Employment Exchange in Brixton, where some of the arrivals sought work. The stowaways were given brief prison sentences, but were allowed to remain in the UK after their release.

Many of Empire Windrush's passengers intended to stay for only a few years. A number did return to the Caribbean, but a majority settled permanently in the UK. Those born in the West Indies who settled in the UK in this migration movement over the following years are now typically referred to as the "Windrush Generation".

==== Previous Caribbean migrant arrivals ====
While the 1948 voyage of the Empire Windrush is well-known, she was not the first ship to bring West Indians to the UK after World War II. On 31 March 1947, Orient Line's Ormonde reached Liverpool from Jamaica with 241 passengers, including 11 stowaways. The passengers included Ralph Lowe, who became the father of the author and poet Hannah Lowe. Liverpool Magistrates Court tried the stowaways and sentenced them to one day in prison, which effectively meant their immediate release.

On 21 December 1947, Royal Mail Line's Almanzora reached Southampton with 200 passengers aboard. As with Empire Windrush, many were former service personnel who had served in the RAF in World War II. 30 adult stowaways and one boy were arrested when the ship docked; they were jailed for 28 days.

== Final years ==
In May 1949, Empire Windrush was en route from Gibraltar to Port Said when fire broke out aboard. Four ships were put on standby to assist if she had to be abandoned. The passengers were placed in the lifeboats, but the boats were not launched, and the ship was subsequently towed back to Gibraltar.

In February 1950, Empire Windrush repatriated the last British troops stationed in Greece, embarking the First Battalion of the Bedfordshire and Hertfordshire Regiment at Thessaloniki on 5 February, and other troops and their families at Piraeus. British troops had been in Greece since 1944, fighting for the Kingdom of Greece in the Greek Civil War.

On 7 February 1953, around 200 nautical miles (370 km) south of the Nicobar Islands, Empire Windrush sighted a small cargo motor ship, Holchu, adrift with a broken mast. Empire Windrush broadcast a general warning by wireless. A British cargo steamship, Ranee, responded by changing course to investigate. Ranee found no trace of Holchu's five crew, and towed the vessel to Colombo. Holchu was carrying a cargo of bagged rice and was in good condition apart from her broken mast; the vessel was not short of food, water or fuel. A meal was found prepared in the ship's galley. The fate of her crew remains unknown, and the incident is cited in several works on Ufology and the Bermuda Triangle.

In June 1953 Empire Windrush took part in the Fleet review to commemorate the Coronation of Queen Elizabeth II.

== Final voyage and loss ==
In February 1954 Empire Windrush left Yokohama for the UK. She called at Kure; Hong Kong; Singapore; Colombo; Aden; and Port Said. Her passengers included recovering wounded United Nations servicemen from the Korean War, including members of the Duke of Wellington's Regiment who had been wounded at the Third Battle of the Hook in May 1953.

The voyage was beset by engine breakdowns and other defects, including a fire after the leaving of Hong Kong. She took ten weeks to reach Port Said, where a party of 50 Royal Marines from 3 Commando Brigade embarked aboard her.

Aboard were 222 crew and 1,276 passengers, including military personnel, and some women and children who were dependents of some of the military personnel. Certified to carry 1,541 people, the ship was almost completely full, with 1,498 people aboard.

=== Fire ===
Where the ship caught fire and where she sank two days later, in the western Mediterranean Sea

At around 0617 hrs on 28 March, Windrush was in the western Mediterranean, off the coast of Algeria, about 30 nautical miles (56 km) northwest of Cape Caxine. A sudden explosion in the engine room killed the Third; Seventh; and Eighth engineers and the First Electrician, and started a fierce fire. Two greasers; one who was the fifth man in the engine room; and another who was in the boiler room, managed to escape. (Note: The four killed were Senior Third Engineer George Stockwell, First Electrician J. W. Graves, Seventh Engineer A. Webster, and Eighth Engineer Leslie Pendleton.)

Both the Chief Officer and the Master were on the bridge. They heard the explosion, and saw black smoke and flames coming from the funnel. Attempts were made to contact the engine room by telephone—it was heard ringing but was not answered. The Chief Officer immediately mustered the ship's firefighting squad, who happened to be on deck at the time doing routine work, and went with them to the engine room. They were able to fight the fire for only a few minutes before the ship's electricity supply failed, stopping the water pumps that fed the fire hoses (all four main generators were inside the burning engine room). The emergency generator was started; this was supposed to power the ship's emergency lighting, bilge pump, fire pump, and radio. But problems with the main circuit breakers made its electricity supply unusable.

The Chief engineer and the Second Engineer were unable to enter the engine room due to dense black smoke. The Second Engineer tried again after obtaining a smoke hood, but could not see because of the smoke. He was unable to close a watertight door that might have contained the fire. Attempts to close all watertight doors using the controls on the bridge also failed.

=== Rescue ===
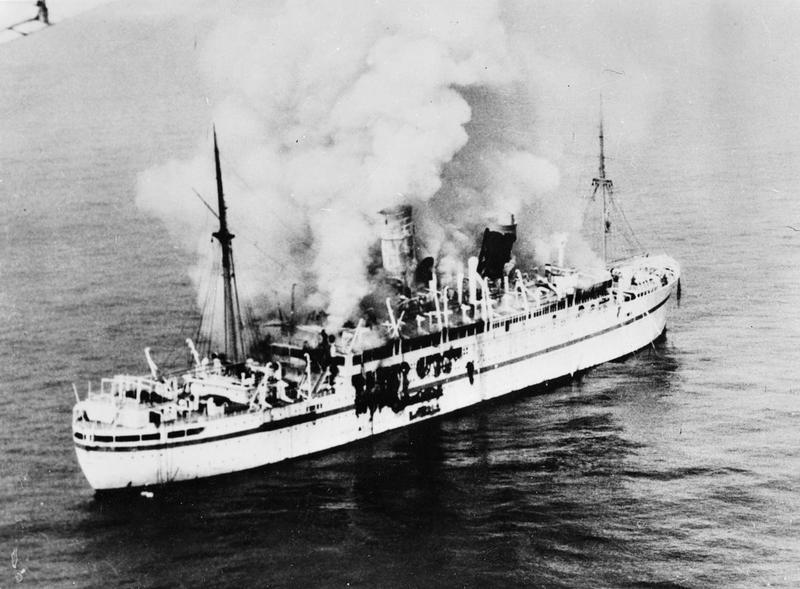
Aerial photograph of the burning Empire Windrush, taken after she was abandoned, 28–29 March 1954

At 0623 hrs the Radio Officer broadcast the first distress signal. This was acknowledged by two French ships, and by radio stations at Gibraltar, Oran and Algiers. After the electric power supply failed, radio signals continued to be sent via the emergency transmitter until 0645 hrs, when the fire stopped the Radio Officer from making further transmissions. The order was given to wake the passengers and crew and muster them at their boat stations. The order was passed by word of mouth, as the loss of electric power had disabled the ship's public address system, electric alarm bells, and air and steam whistles. Passengers and crew had to evacuate in darkness, as the main lighting was also disabled.

At 0645 hrs, firefighting was halted, and the order was given to launch the lifeboats, with the first ones away carrying the women and children and the ship's cat.

Although the ship's 22 lifeboats could accommodate all aboard, thick smoke and the lack of electric power prevented many of them from being launched. Each set of lifeboat davits carried two lifeboats. But without electric power, raising the wire ropes to lower the second boat was by hand, which was arduous and slow. With fire spreading rapidly, the order was given to drop the remaining boats into the sea. In the end, only 12 lifeboats were launched.

Many of the crew and troops abandoned ship by climbing down ladders or ropes and jumping into the sea, after first throwing overboard any loose items at hand that would float Some were rescued by Empire Windrush's lifeboats, others by a boat from the first rescue ship, which arrived at 0700 hrs. The last person to leave Empire Windrush was her Chief Officer, Captain W Wilson, at 0730 hrs. Some people were in the sea for two hours but all were rescued; the only deaths were the four crew killed in the engine room.

The ships responding to Empire Windrush's distress call were the KNSM motor ship Mentor; P&O cargo liner Socotra; Olsen & Ugelstad steamship Hemsefjell; and Italian steamships Taigete and Helschell. An Avro Shackleton aircraft from 224 Squadron RAF assisted.

The rescue ships took the passengers and crew to Algiers, where the French Red Cross and the French Army looked after them. The aircraft carrier HMS Triumph then took them to Gibraltar. Most had lost all their possessions, so new uniforms were issued to the service personnel, and SSAFA clothed the families. From Gibraltar, they returned to the United Kingdom aboard aircraft chartered from British Eagle. The last group arrived on 2 April.

=== Salvage attempt and loss ===
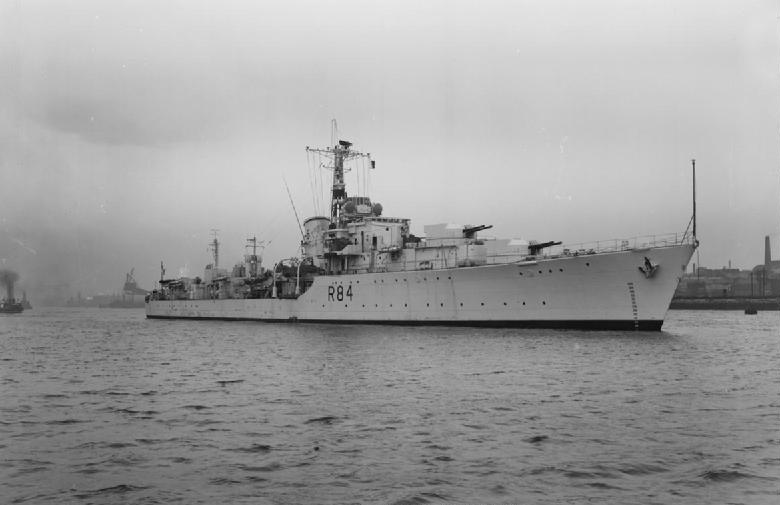
HMS Saintes in 1946

About 26 hours after Empire Windrush was abandoned, HMS Saintes of the Royal Navy's Mediterranean Fleet reached her. The fire was still burning fiercely more than a day after it started, but a party from Saintes managed to board her and secure a tow cable. At about 1230 hrs, Saintes began to tow the ship to Gibraltar, at a speed of about 3 1/2 knots (6.5 km/h). However, at 0030 hrs on 30 March 1954, Empire Windrush sank at position 37°00′N 2°11′E; Saintes had only towed her about 16 kilometres (8.6 nmi). The bodies of the four men killed were not recovered and were lost when she sank. The wreck lies at a depth of about 2,600 m (8,500 ft).

== Inquiry ==
The sinking of Windrush was debated in the House of Commons on 7 April 1954. Member of Parliament, Bessie Braddock asked questions to Minister of Transport Alan Lennox-Boyd regarding the ship's state of repair. One of the engineers killed, Leslie Pendleton, had been her constituent. She had in her possessions five letters he wrote to his father, which described the ship as being in a poor state of repair, subject to continuous serious breakdowns and a previous fire.

An inquiry into the sinking of Empire Windrush was held in London between 21 June and 7 July 1954. John Vickers Naisby, the Commissioner of Wrecks, led the enquiry. Sidney Silverman, lawyer and Member of Parliament, represented the interests of the ship's crew. During the proceedings he tried to show that Empire Windrush was in an unsafe state and not fit to be at sea. Leslie Pendleton's letters were submitted to the enquiry as evidence.

No firm cause for the fire was established, but it was thought the most likely cause was that corrosion in one of the ship's funnels, or "uptakes", may have led to a panel failing, causing incandescently hot soot to fall into the engine room, where it damaged a fuel oil or lubricating oil supply pipe and ignited the leaking oil. An alternative theory was that a fuel pipe fractured and deposited fuel oil onto a hot exhaust pipe. The inquiry concluded that Empire Windrush was seaworthy when she caught fire.

It was thought that the fire consumed much of the oxygen in the engine room. This would have stopped the internal combustion engines that powered the four main electric generators, which would explain the rapid loss of electric power. The rapid depletion of oxygen, and the fire's noxious gases, were thought to have also killed the four engine room crew.

As the ship was government property, she was not insured.

== Legacy ==
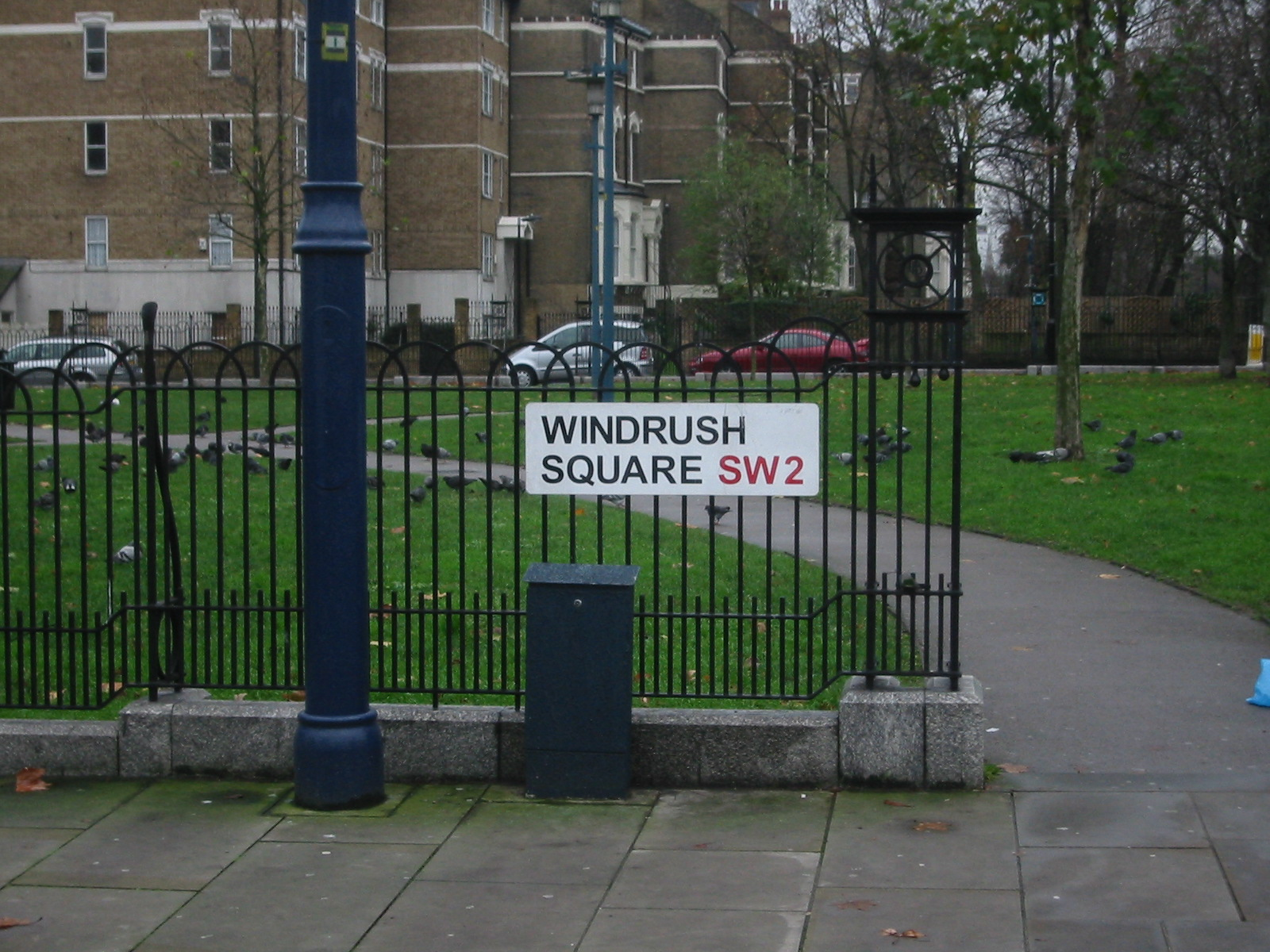
Windrush Square, London, in 2006

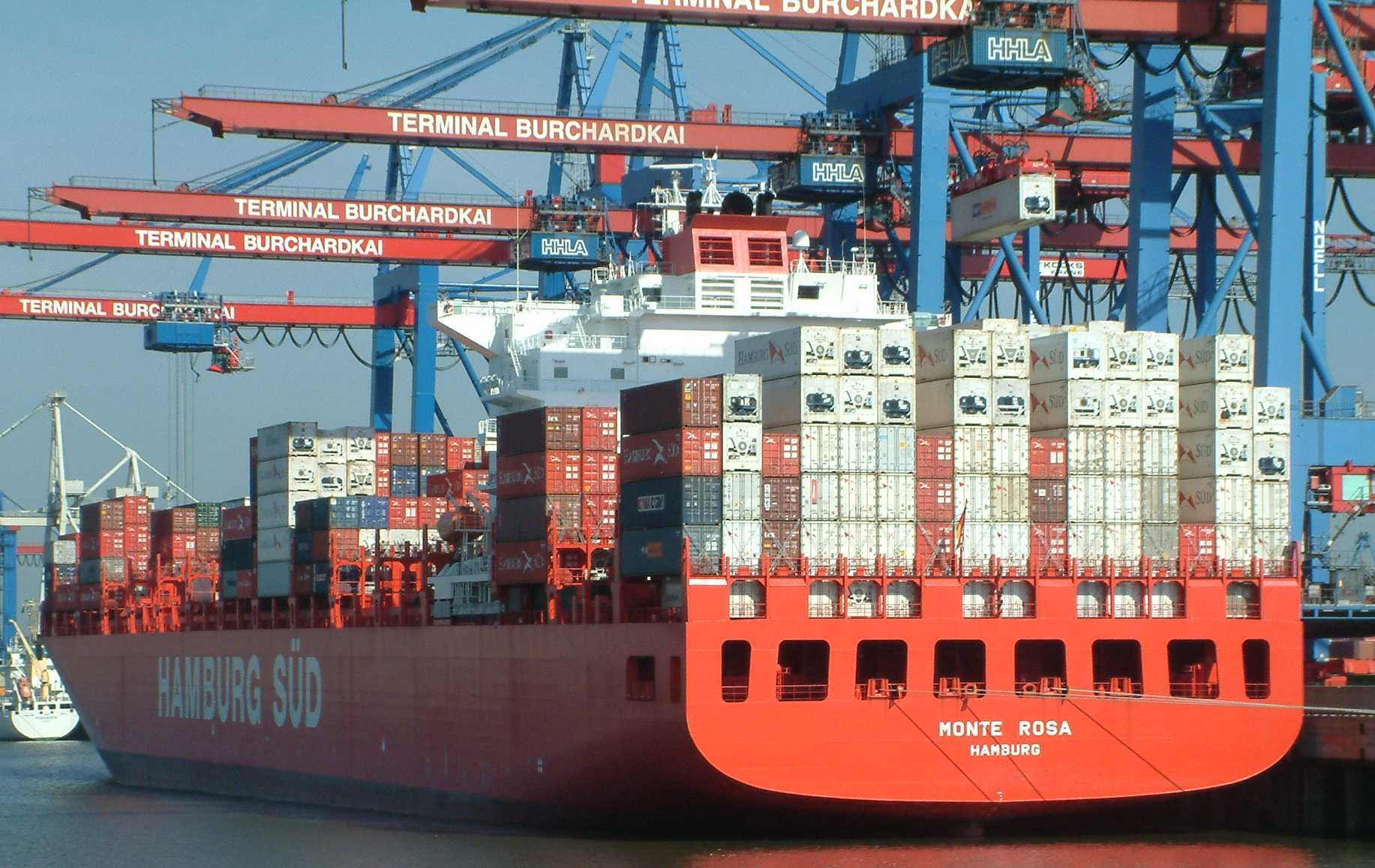
Hamburg Süd container ship Monte Rosa (2005)

In October 1954, one of the military personnel on Empire Windrush during her final voyage was awarded the OBE, and two were awarded the MBE for their roles in the evacuation of the burning ship. Also, a military nurse became an Associate of the Royal Red Cross for her role in evacuating the patients under her care.

In 1998 a public open space in Brixton, London, was renamed Windrush Square to commemorate the 50th anniversary of the arrival of Empire Windrush's West Indian passengers. In 2008 a Thurrock Heritage plaque was unveiled at the London Cruise Terminal at Tilbury to commemorate the "Windrush Generation". On 27 July 2012 this part of the ship's history was briefly commemorated in the Pandemonium sequence of the Opening Ceremony of the Games of the XXX Olympiad in London. A small replica of the ship plastered with newsprint represented her in the ceremony.

In the 2000s, Hamburg Süd commissioned ten container ships of a new Monte class. Several re-use the names of their passenger-ship predecessors, including the container ship Monte Rosa, which has been in service since 2005.

A London Overground rail service in East London was named the Windrush line in 2024. The line runs through areas with strong ties to Caribbean communities today as a celebration of the Windrush generation, and the wider importance of migration to London's culture.

=== Proposed anchor recovery ===
In 2020 a fund-raising effort was begun for a project to recover one of Empire Windrush's anchors, weighing about 1,500 kilograms (3,300 lb). This would be conserved, and then displayed as a monument to the Windrush Generation. In June 2023 an organisation called the Windrush Anchor Foundation announced plans for the salvage. The project is to involve oceanographer David Mearns and is estimated to cost £1 million, which is to be raised by donations.

== See also ==
- MS Monte Rosa – list of ships named Monte Rosa
- Empire Fowey, formerly the German liner Potsdam, captured and converted into a British troopship.
- Empire Orwell, formerly the German cargo liner Pretoria, captured and converted into a British troopship.
- Windrush – a 1998 BBC television documentary series about the first postwar West Indian immigrants to the UK
- Windrush Day, an annual celebration of the contribution of immigrants to UK society. Held on the 22 June, the day the Empire Windrush's passengers disembarked in 1948.
- Windrush scandal, a UK political scandal that began in 2018 concerning people whom the Home Office wrongly detained, denied legal rights, threatened with deportation, or wrongly deported from the UK.

== Bibliography ==
- Arnott, Paul (2019). Windrush: A Ship Through Time. Brimscombe Port: The History Press. ISBN 978-0-7509-9120-9.
- Barnes, James J; Barnes, Patience P (2005). Nazis in Pre-war London, 1930-1939: The Fate and Role of German Party Members and British Sympathizers. Sussex Academic Press. p. 22. ISBN 978-1-84519-053-8.
- Childs, Peter; Storry, Mike, eds. (2002). "Afro-Caribbean communities". Encyclopedia of Contemporary British Culture. London: Routledge.
- Clarkson, John (1995). New Zealand and Federal lines. Preston: J&M Clarkson. ISBN 0-9521179-5-9. OCLC 35599714.
- Claus, Odd (2008). Vitne til krig: en norsk gutts opplevelser i Tyskland 1944–1946 [Witness to war a Norwegian boy's experiences in Germany] (in Norwegian). Oslo: Cappelen Damm. ISBN 978-8204142894. OCLC 313646489.
- The Daily Express, 20 June 1954: a report of the Strength Through Joy programme. Held in The National Archives (UK) as WO 32/15643, and in the British Library Newspaper Library, London.
- Edwards, Paul M (2015). Small United States and United Nations Warships in the Korean War. Jefferson, NC: McFarland & Company. ISBN 978-1-4766-2134-0.
- Ericsson, Kjersti, ed. (2015). Women in war: examples from Norway and beyond. Farnham: Ashgate Publishing Limited. p. 40. ISBN 978-1-4724-4518-6. OCLC 921987565.
- Foreign Office report from the British Consul in Algiers, including a recommendation to invite the Mayor of Algiers to London; an invoice for services rendered by the French Army in Algeria; a full passenger list; and letters from passengers. Held in The National Archives as FO 859/26.
- Gaddis, Vincent H (1965). Invisible Horizons: True Mysteries of the Sea. Ace Books. OCLC 681276.
- Greenhous, Brereton; Harris, Steven J; Johnston, William C (1980). The Official History of the Royal Canadian Air Force. Vol. III: The Crucible of War, 1939–1945. Downsview, ON: University of Toronto Press. ISBN 978-0802005748.
- Grove, Eric (2002). German Capital Ships and Raiders in World War II: From Scharnhorst to Tirpitz, 1942–1944. Psychology Press. ISBN 978-0-7146-5283-2.
- Hansen, Clas Broder (1991). Passenger liners from Germany, 1816-1990. West Chester, Pa: Schiffer Pub. ISBN 978-0-88740-325-5. OCLC 1023218448.
- Hansen, Randall (2000). Citizenship and Immigration in Postwar Britain. Oxford University Press. ISBN 978-0-19-158301-8.
- Haws, Duncan (1985). New Zealand Shipping Co. & Federal S.N. Co. Merchant Fleets. Vol. 7. Burwash: Travel Creatours Ltd Publications. ISBN 0-946378-02-9.
- Hendrie, Andrew (1997). Canadian squadrons in Coastal Command. St Catharines, ON: Vanwell. ISBN 1-55125-038-1. OCLC 38126149.
- Iturralde, Robert (2017). UFOs, Teleportation, and the Mysterious Disappearance of the Malaysian Airlines Flight #370. Robert Iturralde. ISBN 978-1-5356-1151-0.
- Konstam, Angus (2018). Sink the Tirpitz 1942-44: the RAF and Fleet Air Arm Duel with Germany's Mighty Battleship. London: Bloomsbury Publishing. ISBN 978-1-4728-3158-3. OCLC 1057664849.
- Kynaston, David (2007). Austerity Britain 1945–1951. London: Bloomsbury. ISBN 978-0-7475-9923-4.
- Lloyd's Register of Shipping (PDF). London: Lloyd's Register. 1931 – via Southampton City Council.
- Lloyd's Register of Shipping (PDF). London: Lloyd's Register. 1934 – via Southampton City Council.
- Lloyd's Register of Shipping. London: Lloyd's Register. 1947 – via Internet Archive.
- Mace, Martin (2014). The Royal Navy and the War at Sea 1914–1919. Barnsley: Pen and Sword Books. ISBN 978-1-4738-4645-6.
- Mead, Matthew (17 October 2017). "Empire Windrush: Cultural Memory and Archival Disturbance". MoveableType. 3. doi:10.14324/111.1755-4527.027. ISSN 1755-4527.
- The Merchant Shipping Act, 1894 Report of Court (no. 7933) m.v. "Empire Windrush" O.N. 181561 (PDF). London: HMSO. 27 June 1954 – via Southampton City Council.. Held in The National Archives as BT 239/56.
- Miller, William H, Jr (2012). Doomed Ships: Great Ocean Liner Disasters. Courier Corporation. ISBN 978-0-486-14163-3.
- Mitchell, Otis C, ed. (1981). "Karl H Heller – Strength through joy: regimented leisure in Nazi Germany". Nazism and the common man: essays in German history (1929-1939) (2nd ed.). Washington, DC: University Press of America. ISBN 978-0-8191-1546-1.
- O'Connor, Bernard (2016). Sabotage in Norway. Lulu.com. ISBN 978-1-291-38022-4.
- Ottosen, Kristian (1994). "Vedlegg 1". I slik en natt; historien om deportasjonen av jøder fra Norge (in Norwegian). Oslo: Aschehoug. pp. 334–360. ISBN 82-03-26049-7.
- Phillips, Mike; Phillips, Trevor (1988). Windrush: The Irresistible Rise of Multi-Racial Britain. London: HarperCollins. ISBN 978-0-00-653039-8.
- Prager, Hans Georg (1977). Blohm & Voss: ships and machinery for the world. Translated by Bishop, Frederick. Herford. ISBN 3782201388. OCLC 32801123.
- Sanderson, Ivan (2005). Invisible Residents: The Reality of Underwater UFOs. Adventures Unlimited Press. ISBN 1931882207. OCLC 1005460189.
- Schön, Heinz, ed. (2000). Hitlers Traumschiffe: die "Kraft-durch-Freude"-Flotte 1934–1939 (in German). Kiel: Arndt. ISBN 978-3-88741-031-5.
- Mitchell, WH; Sawyer, LA (1995). The Empire Ships. London: Lloyd's of London Press Ltd. ISBN 1-85044-275-4. OCLC 246537905.
- Schwerdtner, Nils (2013). German Luxury Ocean Liners: From Kaiser Willhelm to Aidastella. Amberley: Amberley Publishing Ltd. ISBN 978-1-4456-1471-7. OCLC 832608271.
- Seybold, WN (1998). Women and children first – the loss of the troopship "Empire Windrush". Ballaugh, IoM: Captain WN Seybold. ISBN 0953354105. OCLC 39962436.
- Smith, Malcolm (2014). The Royal Naval Air Service During the Great War. Barnsley: Pen and Sword Books. ISBN 978-1-78346-383-1.
- Tillotson, Michael (2012). SOE and The Resistance: As Told in The Times Obituaries. London: Bloomsbury. ISBN 978-1-4411-1971-1.
- Tugwell, Maurice, ed. (1957). ""On Fire at Sea", by Geoffrey Dockerill". The Unquiet Peace: Stories from the Post War Army. London.
- War Office files on the loss, including contemporary press cuttings. Held in The National Archives as WO 32/15643.
- Werner, Emmy E (2005). A conspiracy of decency: the rescue of the Danish Jews during World War II. Boulder, CO: Westview. ISBN 978-0-7867-4669-9. OCLC 824698950.
