= Kirovograd (disambiguation) =

Kirovograd (Russian: Кировогра́д) or Kirovohrad (Ukrainian: Кіровогра́д) is a former name of Kropyvnytskyi, a city in Ukraine.

The name may also refer to:

- Kirovohrad Oblast, of which Kropyvnytskyi is the administrative center
- Ganja, Azerbaijan, a city in Azerbaijan formerly named Kirovograd
- SS Kirovograd, a Soviet cargo ship

== See also ==
- Kirovograd offensive
