= MS Monte Rosa =

Several motor ships have borne the name Monte Rosa after Monte Rosa, the highest mountain in Switzerland:

- MV Monte Rosa was a 13,882-ton passenger ship launched on 4 December 1930, by Blohm & Voss in Hamburg, Germany. Used as a troop ship during the Second World War, she was captured by the British in 1945 and renamed Empire Windrush. Suffered a major fire and sank on 30 March 1954.
- MS Monte Rosa (1954) was a 4,473-ton ore carrier launched as Björnö on 9 October 1954, by Howaldtswerke in Kiel, Germany. Converted to oil tanker in 1968. Renamed Monte Rosa in 1971. Wrecked off Grande River, Italy, on 26 February 1973.
- MS Monte Rosa (1969) was a 2,998-ton cargo ship completed as Biko Maru in September 1969, by Imabari Zosen in Imabari, Ehime, Japan. Renamed Monte Rosa in 1974, renamed three more times after that. Lost in collision on 15 July 1994.
- MS Monte Rosa (1977) was a 50,722-ton container ship launched in April 1977 by Mitsubishi in Kobe, Japan, as Thames Maru. Renamed Monte Rosa in 1989, to Neptune Cyprine in 1993 and back to Monte Rosa in 1994. Broken up in Chine in December 2001.
- MS Monte Rosa (1981) was a 21,871-ton container ship launched on 30 May 1981, by Schichau Seebeckwerft in Bremerhaven, Germany for Hamburg Süd. Renamed Columbus Canterbury in 1996 and Alianca Urca in 2002. Scrapped in Alang, India, on 17 December 2008.
- MS Monte Rosa (1982) was a 7,037-ton bulk carrier launched on 1 November 1982, by Taihei Kogyo in Akitsu, Japan. for Harald Schuldt & Co KG. Renamed three times, to Haci Arif Kaptan in 1997. Active as of 2007.
- MS Monte Rosa (1996) was a 16,211-ton container ship launched as Columbus La Plataon 6 December 1996, by Nordseewerke in Emden, Germany. Renamed Monte Rosa in 2000 and five more times after that. Still active as of 2011.
- Monte Rosa (ship) is a 16,211-ton container ship completed in March 2005, by Daewoo Shipbuilding & Marine Engineering in Okpo-dong, South Korea. Still active.
