= Pernambuco (disambiguation) =

Pernambuco is a Brazilian state.

Pernambuco can also refer to the following :

Places and jurisdictions

- Captaincy of Pernambuco, or New Lusitania, a hereditary land grant and colonial administrative subdivision of northern Portuguese Brazil
- the former Latin Catholic Territorial Prelature of Pernambuco, now Metropolitan Archdiocese of Olinda e Recife

Other

- Paubrasilia echinata, a timber tree which produces wood known as Pernambuco
- MV Krasnodar (1925), a cargo ship called MV Pernambuco from 1928 to 1945
- Pernambuco (footballer) (born 1998), a Brazilian football player, full name José Vitor Rodrigues da Silva dos Santos
- "Pernambuco", an instrumental guitar piece composed by Luiz Bonfá
