= MV Monte Pascoal (1930) =

1930 German ocean liner

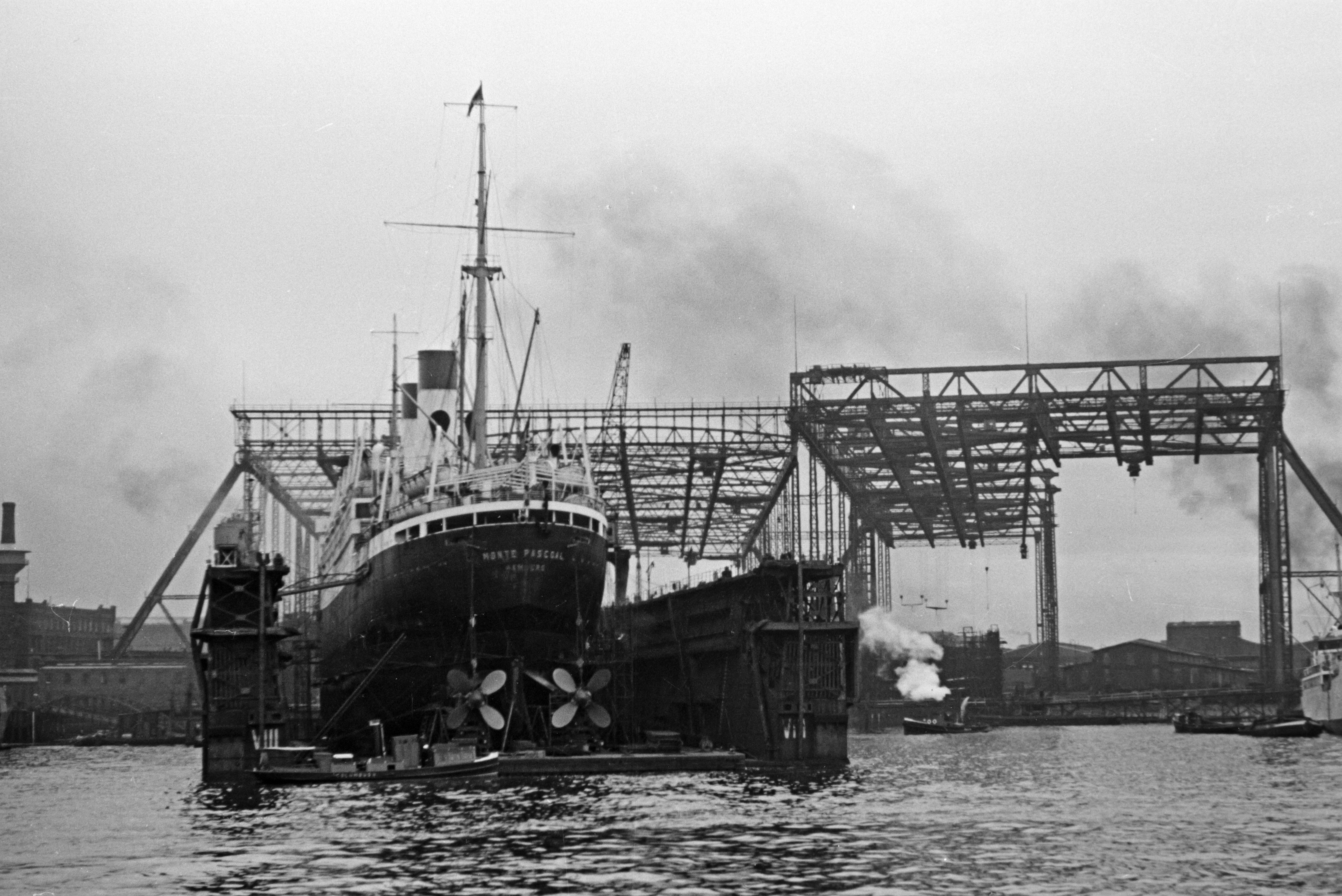
- Monte Pascoal before her launch

History
- Name: Monte Pascoal
- Namesake: Monte Pascoal
- Owner: Hamburg-Süd DG (1930–45); UK Admiralty (1945–46)
- Operator: Hamburg-Süd DG (1930–41); Kriegsmarine (1941–45); UK Admiralty (1945–46)
- Port of registry: (Weimar Republic) Hamburg (1930–35); (Nazi Germany) Hamburg (1935–41); Kriegsmarine (1941–45); (United Kingdom) UK (1945–46)
- Builder: Blohm & Voss
- Yard number: 491
- Launched: 17 September 1930
- Completed: 15 January 1931
- Maiden voyage: 26 January 1931
- Out of service: 3 February 1944
- Identification: code letters RHVM (1931–33); call sign DIDT (1934–45)
- Fate: Scuttled 31 December 1946

General characteristics
- Class & type: Monte-class ocean liner
- Type: Ocean liner (1930–41); Accommodation ship (1941–44)
- Tonnage: 13,870 GRT, 7,762 NRT
- Length: 152.60 metres (500 ft 8 in)
- Beam: 19.99 metres (65 ft 7 in)
- Depth: 11.48 metres (37 ft 8 in)
- Decks: Four
- Installed power: 4 diesel engines, 1,436 NHP
- Propulsion: Twin screw propellers
- Speed: 14 knots (26 km/h)
- Capacity: 2,500 passengers
- Notes: sister ships Monte Cervantes, Monte Olivia, Monte Rosa and Monte Sarmiento

Monte Pascoal was a German Monte-class ocean liner built in 1930 by Blohm & Voss, Hamburg for the Hamburg-Südamerikanische Dampfschifffahrts-Gesellschaft (HSDG). She managed to reach Germany after the outbreak of World War II and was requisitioned by the Kriegsmarine for use as an accommodation ship. She was sunk in 1944 during an Allied air raid on Wilhelmshaven. Subsequently, refloated, she was seized by the Allies post war and was scuttled in the Skaggerak with a cargo of gas bombs in 1946.

She can be briefly seen moored in London's docks in the short 1939 travelogue film "River Thames".

== Description ==
Monte Pascoal was 152.60 metres (500 ft 8 in) long, with a beam of 19.99 metres (65 ft 7 in). She had a depth of 10.87 metres (35 ft 8 in). The ship was assessed at 13,870 GRT, 7,762 NRT. She was powered by four four stroke single cycle, single action diesel engines which drove twin screw propellers through single reduction gearing. The engines were built by Blohm & Voss and rated at 1,436 NHP, giving her a speed of 14 knots (26 km/h).

The ship had berths for 2,500 third class. This was reduced to 1,500 when she was used for cruises.

== History ==
Monte Pascoal was built as yard number 491 by Blohm & Voss for HSDG. She was launched on 17 September 1930 and completed on 15 January 1931. Her code letters were RHVM until 1934, when they were superseded by the call sign DIDT.

The ship made her maiden voyage on 26 January, sailing from Hamburg to ports on the Río de la Plata, South America. Apart from use on the South American route, she also operated cruises off the coast of Norway and in the Mediterranean Sea. Her port of registry was Hamburg. In August 1933, she operated a series of cruises between Hamburg and Greenwich.

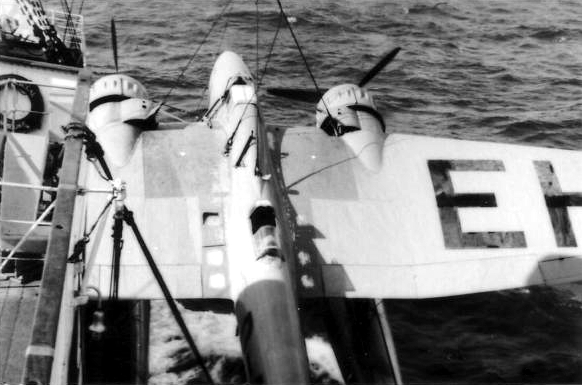
The Heinkel He115 aircraft that was recovered by Monte Pascoal.

In the Spanish Civil War Monte Pascoal repatriated 226 German volunteers from Sevilla back to Hamburg in June 1937. In January 1939, a Luftwaffe Heinkel He 115 aircraft, registration D-AEHF, suffered an engine failure over the Atlantic Ocean. The aircraft landed alongside Monte Pascoal, which rescued the crew and lifted the aircraft from the water using a derrick at the bow of the ship.

When the Second World War broke out in September 1939, Monte Pascoal was in Buenos Aires, Argentina. Departing on 10 September without passengers and two of her crew having refused to sail, she successfully returned to Germany, arriving at Hamburg on 14 October 1939.

On 11 January 1941 the Kriegsmarine requisitioned Monte Pascoal. She was used as an accommodation ship at Wilhelmshaven. On 3 February 1944 the United States Eighth Air Force bombed Wilhelmshaven. Monte Pascoal was set afire and was scuttled. She was refloated on 12 May and beached. In May 1945 the UK seized her as a prize of war. On 5 August 1946 she left Wilhelmshaven for Hamburg. Monte Pascoal was scuttled in the Skaggerak on 31 December 1946 with a cargo of obsolete gas bombs aboard.
