= HMS Justice =

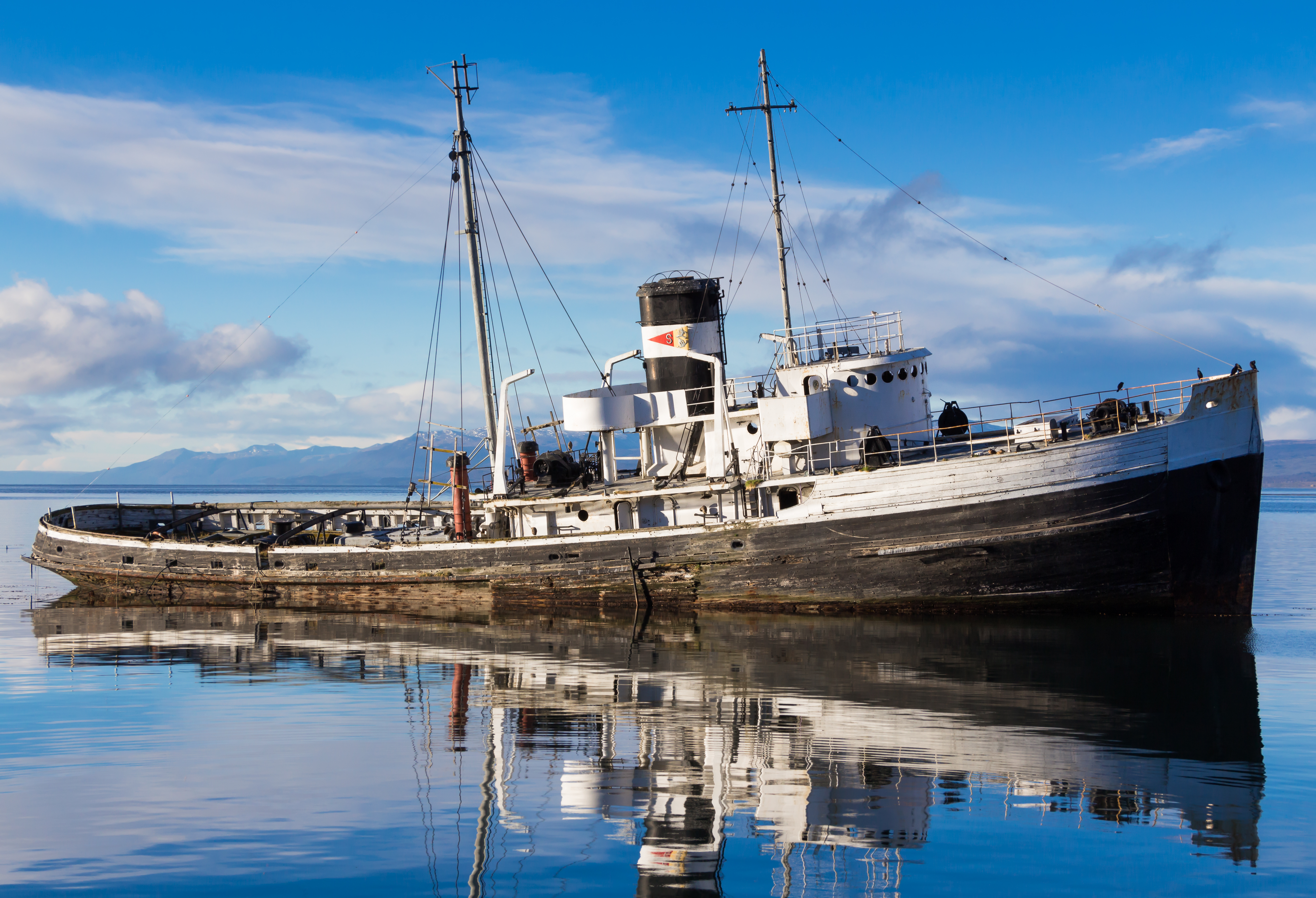

History

United Kingdom
- Name: HMS Justice (W-140)
- Builder: Camden Shipbuilding & Marine Railway Co.; Camden, Maine, United States
- Laid down: 20 January 1943 (as ATR-20)
- Launched: 18 October 1943
- Sponsored by: Miss Joy D. Creyk
- Completed: 24 April 1944
- Acquired: 24 April 1944
- Commissioned: 24 April 1944 at Boston, Massachusetts
- Fate: Returned to U.S. Navy, 20 March 1946

United States
- Acquired: 20 March 1946
- Reclassified: BATR-20
- Stricken: 3 July 1946
- Fate: Sold, 3 October 1947; Grounded and abandoned, Ushuaia, Argentina; 54.809694°S 68.308117°W

General characteristics
- Class & type: ATR-1-class rescue tug
- Displacement: 1,360 tons
- Length: 165 ft 5 in (50.42 m)
- Beam: 33 ft 6 in (10.21 m)
- Draught: 15 ft 10 in (4.83 m)
- Propulsion: triple-expansion reciprocating steam engines, single screw, 1,600 hp
- Speed: 12 knots (22 km/h)
- Complement: 32 officers and men
- Armament: 1 × 3"/50 caliber gun; 3 × 20 mm guns

HMS Justice (W-140), a Royal Navy ship classified as a rescue tug, was built in the United States as U.S. Navy ATR-1-class rescue tug ATR-20. Never commissioned into the U.S. Navy, she was transferred to the Royal Navy under Lend-Lease at delivery. Returned to the U.S. after the end of World War II, she was redesignated BATR-20. Struck and sold for commercial service in 1946, she was eventually grounded at Ushuaia, Argentina and abandoned.

== Operational history ==
ATR-20 was laid down by Camden Shipbuilding & Marine Railway Co., Camden, Maine, 20 January 1943; launched 18 October 1943; sponsored by Miss Joy D. Creyk; transferred to the United Kingdom under lendlease 24 April 1944; and commissioned as HMS Justice at Boston, Massachusetts the same day.

During the remainder of World War II, Justice served as a rescue tug in the Royal Navy. She reportedly served at the Normandy invasion in June 1944.

Justice was returned to the U.S. Navy on 20 March 1946 and redesignated BATR-20. She was struck from the Naval Vessel Register on 3 July 1946 and sold 3 October 1947 to Leopoldo Simoncini of Buenos Aires as the Costa Rican-flagged St. Christopher. In 1953 she was chartered for salvage operations in Beagle Channel on the sunken Hamburg South America Line ocean liner SS Monte Cervantes along with several Argentine Navy vessels.

After suffering engine trouble and rudder damage in 1954, it was laid up at Ushuaia, Argentina. She was beached and abandoned there in 1957, and, in 2004, had its remaining fuel oil removed. As of 2024, St. Christopher is still grounded and abandoned at Ushuaia.
