= SS Ormonde =

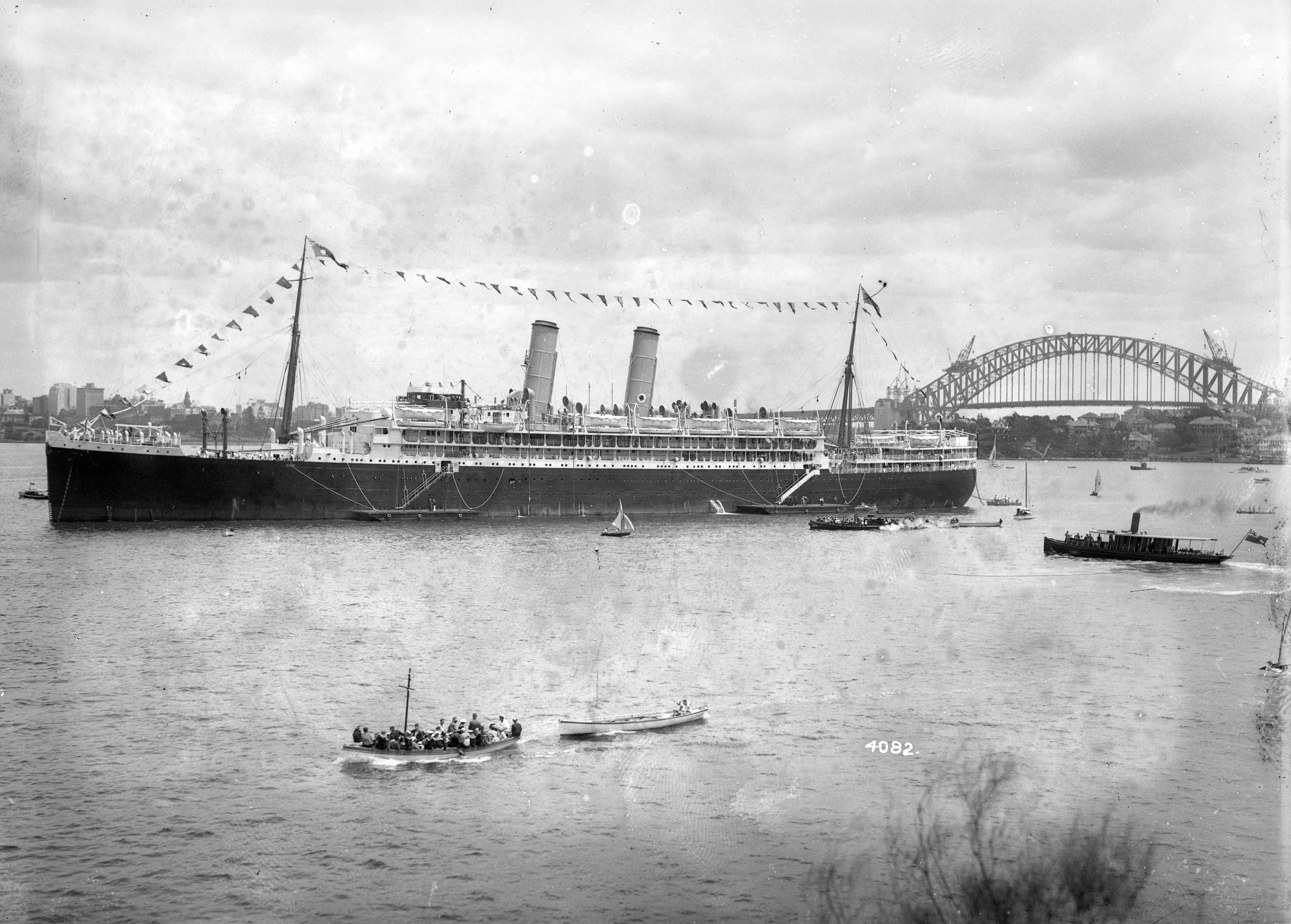
RMS Ormonde at anchor in Sydney Harbour, 1931

SS Ormonde or RMS Ormonde was a British ocean liner and later troopship. It was notable as the first post-war migrant ship from the Caribbean to dock at Tilbury Docks on 31 March 1947, over a year before the better known HMT Empire Windrush. For this journey there were 241 passengers, including 11 stowaways and 6 distressed seamen (sailors without a ship). Poet Hannah Lowe's father, Ralph, was among those on board.

== History ==
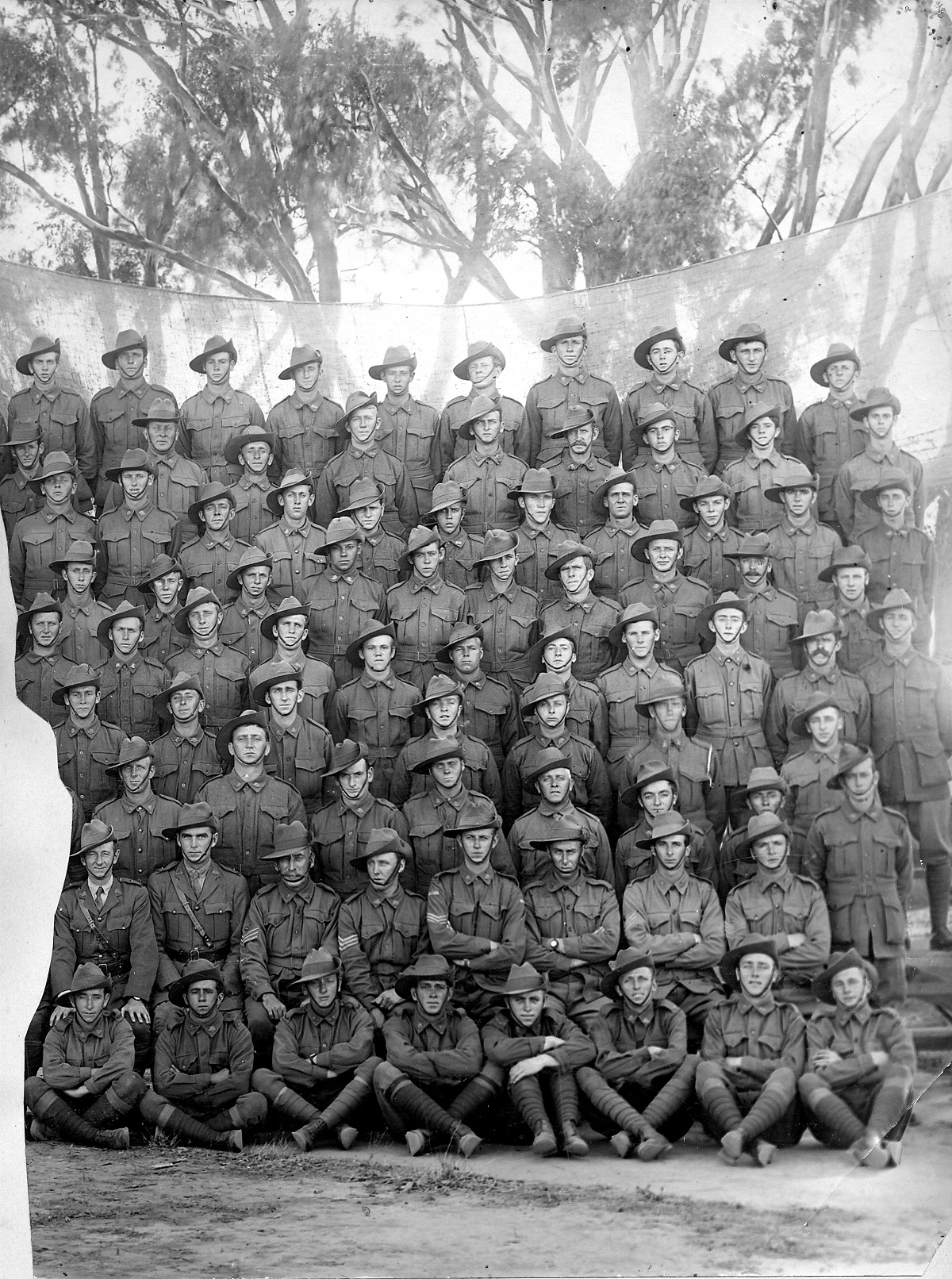
Soldiers of the 43rd Battalion, who embarked at Port Melbourne, Victoria on RMS Ormonde on 7 March 1918

Ormonde had a troubled construction. She was built by John Brown & Company in Clydebank for the Orient Steam Navigation Company as their first ship with a cruiser stern and geared turbines. However, in August 1914 construction was delayed by the outbreak of World War I. In October 1917, she was requisitioned as a troopship, arriving in Sydney in February 1918 to take Australian troops to Egypt. In 1919, she was returned to John Brown & Co to be fitted out as a passenger liner, taking her first passenger voyage to Brisbane on 15 November.

She was damaged in April 1920 in the Suez Canal, having to be repaired in Colombo, Ceylon. In 1922 she was transferred to the Norway route. In April 1923 she was converted to oil and in 1933 she was refitted to single class accommodation, providing a capacity of 770.

World War II saw her again requisitioned as a troopship, this time with a capacity of 1,560. She was involved in the evacuation from Norway and from France. Her final return from the Caribbean marked the first substantial landing of Caribbean migrants to the UK. In April 1947, she was released from military service and refitted, only to be chartered by the government again in October 1947 to transport emigrants to Australia (now with a capacity of 1052).

Following the Indonesian National Revolution, Ormonde was chartered by the Dutch government to evacuate citizens from Indonesia in March 1950. Then in November she returned as a troopship for New Zealand troops in the Korean War.

Finally, she was scrapped on 5 December 1952 at Troon.
