= John Jellicoe Blair =

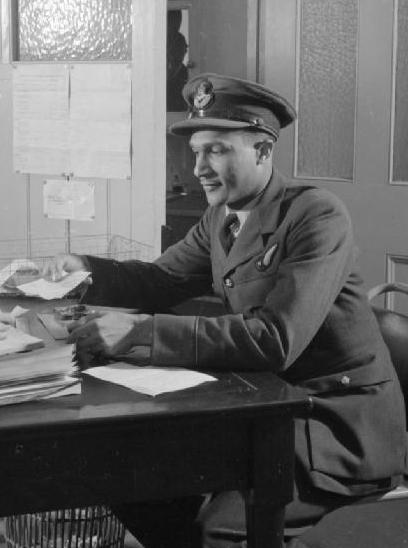
- John Jellicoe Blair at the Colonial Club in London, 1944
- Born: 1919; St Elizabeth, Jamaica
- Died: 2004 (aged 84–85)
- Military career
- Service years: 1942-1963
- Units: 102 (Ceylon) Squadron; No. 216 Squadron RAF; No. 35 Squadron RAF
- Awards: Distinguished Flying Cross (1945)

John Jellicoe Blair, DFC (1919–2004) was a Jamaican Royal Air Force (RAF) pilot and navigator for RAF Bomber Command during the Second World War. Having been assigned to 102 (Ceylon) Squadron in December 1944, he navigated Halifax Bombers.

In 1945, he was awarded the Distinguished Flying Cross.

== Early life and education ==
John Jellicoe Blair was born in 1919 in St Elizabeth, Jamaica, the eighth and youngest sibling born unexpectedly seven years after the previous child. By the time he began school at age five, his sister Jemima was already a teacher at the school. At age ten he moved to stay with his eldest sister Clarissa, who was also a teacher, and later lived with his brother Stanley, who became a school inspector. They later settled in Ocho Rios for a short while before Blair returned to his parents in St Elizabeth, where at the age of 17 he completed his early education.

== Early career ==
On his second attempt Blair gained admission to Mico Training College in Kingston and spent three years there before qualifying as an elementary school teacher. For the subsequent one and a half years, he taught at the Greenwich School, during which time the Second World War had begun.

== Second World War ==
=== Training ===
In 1941, unable to join the Army or Navy due to the colour bar, Blair applied to join the Royal Air Force (RAF) that had recently lifted the colour restriction due to its high casualties. In October 1942 at the age of 23, he left Jamaica bound for RCAF Station Moncton, Canada, with around 30 other RAF volunteers. The following month, Blair and the other 20 that still remained of his group were sent to a training base for the Royal Canadian Air Force, where he learned Canadian military and Air Force systems before completing his basic training in Toronto. Selected for flying, he was sent along with his friend Arthur Wint to study at McGill University before eventually being selected for training in navigation. After completing flight school in January 1943 and subsequently passing the navigator's course, he trained on Ansons before returning to Monckton.

In January 1944, both Blair as navigator and Winton as pilot, boarded a ship at Halifax and disembarked at Glasgow. Blair was eventually posted to RAF Kinloss in Scotland after completing a battle course and further navigation training at RAF Filey in Yorkshire. At Kinloss, pilot Ralph Pearson asked Blair to fly with him, and they remained together until the end of the War. They were joined by two gunners, a wireless operator, a flight engineer and a bomb aimer, and completed initial training on an old Whitely. Blair navigated using direct vision of the ground, Met reports and Gee, a radio system that used beams transmitted from the ground to give him directional readings.

=== Operations ===
In December 1944 Blair was assigned to 102 (Ceylon) Squadron and navigated Halifax Bombers for Bomber Command. In a later interview he recalled his first operation on 21 December, when his aircraft attacked Nippes. He flew his last mission in April 1945. By the end of the War he had completed a full tour of 30 bombing operations plus three more operational flights, and spent a short while with Pathfinder (RAF).

He was one of more than 400 Black Caribbean air crew in the RAF during the War.

== Later life ==
After the War, he joined No. 35 Squadron RAF, with whom he worked with Lancaster bombers, and stayed with them until October 1947. He subsequently became a navigation instructor at RAF Scampton. Blair made several failed attempts to locate Pearson, initially travelling to York immediately after the War and then travelling to Vancouver in 1959.

Blair's final post was of Chief navigation Officer for No. 216 Squadron RAF. He retired in 1963.

== Awards and honours ==
In late 1945, he was awarded the Distinguished Flying Cross.

== Death and legacy ==
Blair died in 2004. An account of his life is given in Mark Johnson's Caribbean Volunteers at War: The Forgotten Story of the RAF's 'Tuskegee Airmen' (2014).

== See also ==
- Tuskegee Airmen
- RAF Bomber Command aircrew of World War II
- RAF Transport Command

== Bibliography ==
- Johnson, Mark (2014). Caribbean Volunteers at War: The Forgotten Story of the RAF's 'Tuskegee Airmen'. Barnsley, South Yorkshire: Pen and Sword. ISBN 978-1-78346-291-9.
