= MV Monte Cervantes =

1920s German passenger liner

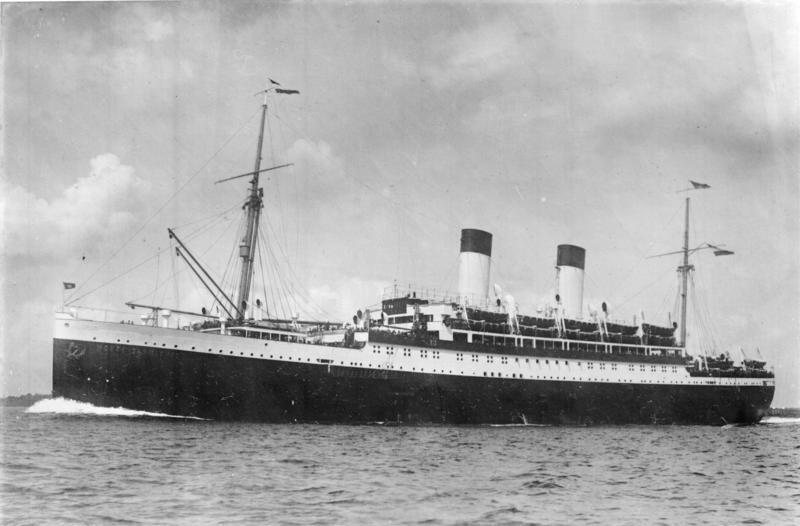
- MV Monte Cervantes, circa 1928

History

Germany
- Name: Monte Cervantes
- Owner: Hamburg South American Line, now Hamburg Süd
- Port of registry: Hamburg
- Builder: Blohm & Voss, Hamburg
- Launched: 25 August 1927
- Maiden voyage: 3 January 1928
- Fate: Sank 23 January 1930 near Les Eclaireurs Lighthouse

General characteristics
- Class & type: Monte class ocean liner
- Tonnage: 13,913 GRT
- Displacement: 20,000 tons
- Length: 152.50 m (500 ft 4 in)
- Beam: 20.00 m (65 ft 7 in)
- Draft: 11.50 m (37 ft 9 in)
- Installed power: 6,800 HP
- Propulsion: Twin screw propellers
- Speed: 14.5 kn (26.85 km/h)
- Capacity: 2,492 passengers; (later reduced to approximately 1,750)
- Crew: 325

MV Monte Cervantes was a 500 ft (150 m) German passenger liner that sailed the South American route from Buenos Aires to Puerto Madryn (Chubut) to Punta Arenas to Ushuaia and return to Buenos Aires. The ship sailed under German registration and belonged to the South American Hamburg Company. After only two years of service she sank at the beginning of 1930 near Tierra del Fuego. The ship became known as "The Titanic of the South."

On 22 January 1930, Monte Cervantes departed Ushuaia and within 30 minutes struck some submerged rocks in the Pan de Indio. The ship could not be dislodged and began to sink. The lifeboats were lowered and 1,200 passengers and 350 crew were removed from the ship. Monte Cervantes sank 24 hours later, and while all the passengers and crew were able to leave the ship before she sank, her captain was killed. The remainder of the crew and all of the passengers were saved.

== Ship ==
Monte Cervantes was christened on 25 August 1927 by builders Blohm + Voss as the third ship of the Monte class. Four months later, on 3 January 1928, the ship was placed into service under the Hamburg South American Steam Ship Company KG (HSDG), home-ported at Hamburg, Germany. The ship was scheduled to operate regularly between Hamburg and the South American capitals of Rio de Janeiro and Buenos Aires. Soon the routes of the ship were expanded to include entertainment trips to both continents. For this the maximum passenger capacity was reduced from 2,492 places to about 1,750 places to increase the luxury aspects of the journey. The ship possessed 30 life boats and was modernly furnished for its time. The passengers had access to a large, convenient promenade deck, two roomy dining rooms, a large smoking salon, a comfortable theatre, a post office, and a library. In the price groups IA to V the cabins had running water, while travellers of the price group VI and those of the sleeping halls enjoyed well-lighted, white-tiled men's and women's bathrooms. Additionally the ship had a beauty salon for ladies and a barber shop for the gentlemen.

=== Meals ===
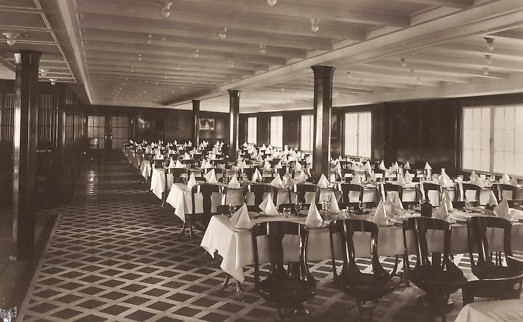
The ship's dining hall, 1928

Meals on board were described in the travel brochure as "plentiful, nutritious and varied." As an example the shipboard menu for 30 May 1929 included cooked eggs, pancakes with applesauce, and oatmeal in milk for breakfast; broth with Tyrolean bacon dumplings, roast veal, young peas, potatoes, and California apricots for lunch; afternoon tea with filled bee sting cake; and schnitzel (Milan-style) for dinner. The full menu as well as normal drinking water was included in the cruise cost. There were additional charges for wine, beer, mineral water, liquor, and tobacco products.

=== Cabin rates ===
The cost of a cruise on Monte Cervantes varied, depending upon size of the passenger cabin and the cruise itself, between 240 and 630 Reichsmarks. The Reichsmark (English: Reich Mark; symbol: RM) was the currency in Germany from 1924 until 1948. For 240 RM, a passenger was in a sleeping hall with 120 or more beds on Deck F; next up were nine to eleven-bed cabins on Deck E; most expensive were cabins for two, exterior Deck A. all passengers were treated equally on board ship. The difference in cabin cost depended on the location and type of cabin.

== Service ==
On 7 January 1928, Monte Cervantes began her maiden voyage under the command of Captain Meyer, cruising from Hamburg to La Plata, Argentina.

=== Svalbard incident ===
Only six months later, on 24 July 1928, the steamship was on a journey from North Cape to Svalbard Norway and traveled through a field of ice floes. About 11 pm it struck something and the hull began leaking. Probably the ship had collided with a small iceberg. Attempts to pump out the water flowing in proved unsuccessful in that some areas of the foredeck quickly came under five meters (16.5 feet) of water. The ship made directly for Spitsbergen in search of a bay in which to anchor. About 1,800 passengers on board at the time had to be placed ashore. The Soviet icebreaker Krasin was about 80 miles (130 km) from Monte Cervantes, responded to the ship's distress call, and offered her assistance. The crew of Monte Cervantes and divers from Krasin set about repairing the damage. The repairs took several days and were final on 29 July, so that the trip could be continued. During these five days of uncertainty and waiting, European newspapers had continued to report the details of the accident and the rescue, and the crisis captured the interest of the public. As part of the reporting, the ship became known as "The Titanic of the South" or "The Argentinian Titanic."

== Sinking ==
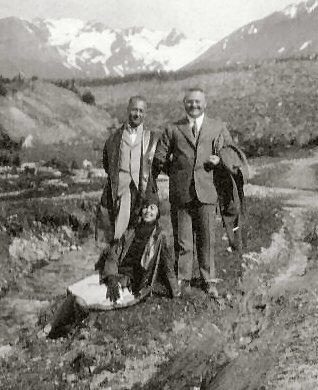
Employees of U.S. Consulate (Buenos Aires) prior to boarding Monte Cervantes at Ushuaia, 22 Jan

One and a half years later, in early 1930, Monte Cervantes was on a South America trip under the command of Captain Theodor Dreyer of Hamburg and First Officer Reiling. On 17 January, the ship arrived in Puerto Madryn, and on the morning of 20 January in Punta Arenas. The next day the ship sailed in bad weather but found calm seas in the Beagle Channel near Tierra del Fuego and reached Ushuaia around 19:00 hours [7 pm]. On the morning of 22 January, Monte Cervantes weighed anchor and cruised in the direction of Yendegaia Bay, 15 nautical miles (28 km) to the west. The captain steered a safe route around Les Eclaireurs Lighthouse and chose a route through vast fields of seaweed and numerous small islands.

=== Collision ===
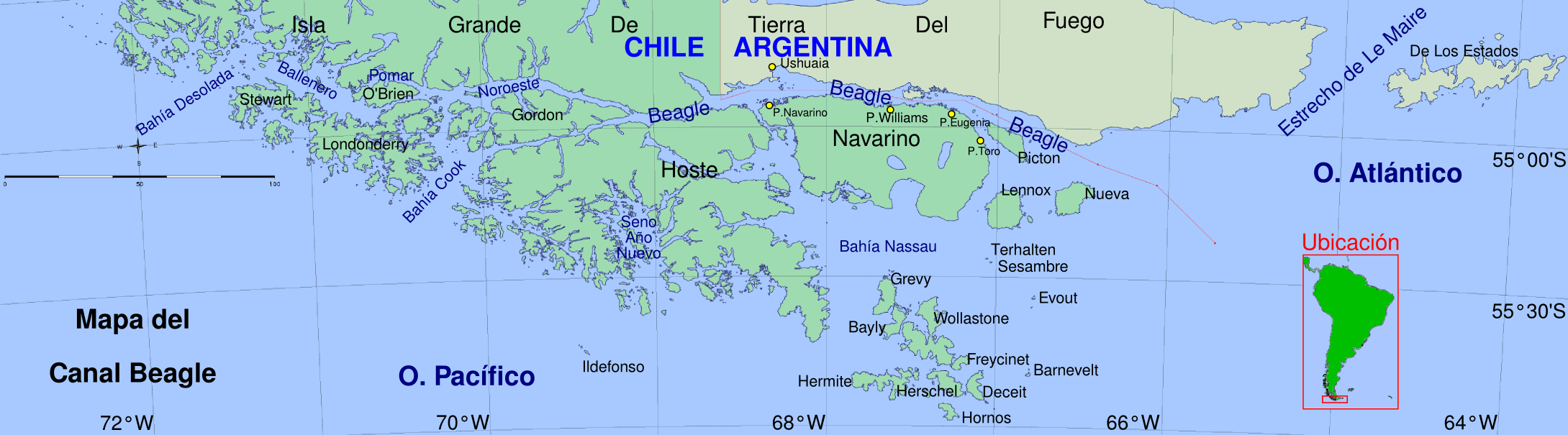
The Monte Cervantes departed Ushuaia in the Beagle Channel, heading west on 22 January 1930.

About 12:40 pm, the lookout on the bridge spotted a submerged rock directly ahead and the captain ordered an immediate change of course. This course was confirmed around 12:43 pm by First Officer Reiling using location bearings. Seconds later the ship struck a rock which did not show on the nautical charts at that time. The outer skin of Monte Cervantes was ripped open and water poured in. According to a passenger, there was a "formidable breach in the keel and a thunderous din of roaring engines and then, suddenly, the boat leaned left." The resulting shock and vibrations caused innumerable plates, cups, and even furniture to break. The hatches were closed, but soon Monte Cervantes slipped a little and slid slightly back into the sea. More water poured into the interior and flooded the cargo hold and steerage.

=== Evacuation and assistance ===
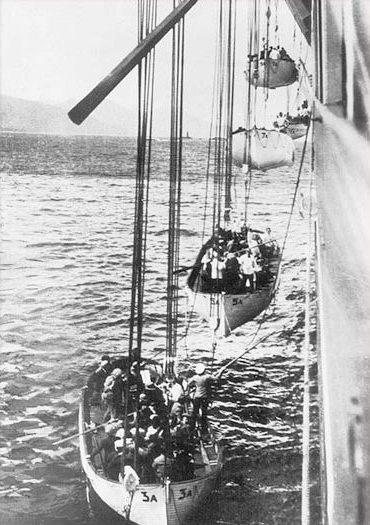
Lifeboats being lowered

Immediately after Monte Cervantes slipped from the rock, the command was given to lower away the lifeboats from E-Deck. This initially resulted in a small panic among the passengers, but the crew explained that the 30 boats remaining would still be enough to receive an additional 500 passengers, and the anxiety was relieved. All 1,117 passengers and 255 of the crew members were successfully evacuated and began rowing against the wind toward Ushuaia. A passenger later reported that the rescue was not always pleasant: "...a high wind rose and enormous waves lifted us to a height of ten metres [33 feet], letting us fall again in great precipices, nearly turning over the boats. It was terrifying! The waves drenched us with glacial water, from head to toe. My legs were stiff and my right arm was paralyzed after clinging for so long to the edge of the boat."

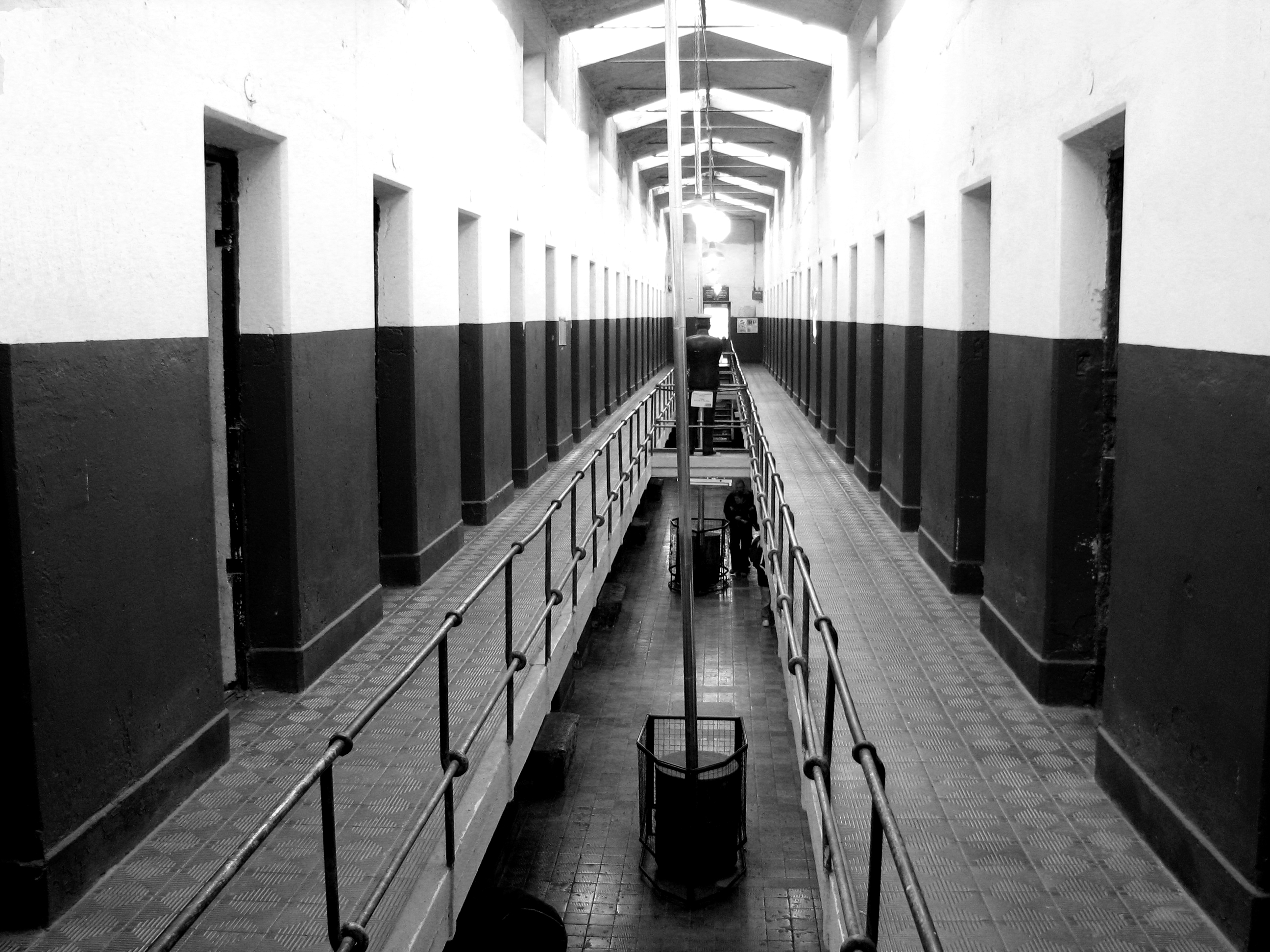
Some passengers had to be housed in this prison, today a museum in Ushuaia

At the time of the collision the wireless operator had immediately sent out an SOS. The signal was received by numerous stations on both sides of the Atlantic Ocean. The Argentine freighter Vincente Fidel Lopez in the port of Ushuaia also heard the call and headed out to assist Monte Cervantes, but on the way suffered an accident itself with its launch. The remaining crew on Monte Cervantes meanwhile collected all objects of value to the passengers that they could find and handed them to the arriving launch, also requesting that the launch pick up the passengers from the lifeboats. Shortly after the departure of the first motor launch, a second launch, from the prison of Ushuaia, appeared and offered its assistance. It was sent back and soon returned with several piles of warming blankets. Shortly thereafter the Vincente Fidel Lopez reached the shipwreck site. It took passengers on board from the life boats and carried approximately 800 persons safely to the mainland. Meanwhile, some of the other lifeboats had wandered off course and drifted to remote coastal regions. Their passengers had to take a long walk through a thickly wooded area before they also reached the town of Ushuaia, which at the time had a population of about 800. Thus the 1,200 passengers produced a strain on the community, which housed some of the passengers in the town's prison.

=== Run aground ===
After the last lifeboat had sufficiently cleared the reef, Monte Cervantes′s engines – which were still functional since the engine room had not flooded – again were started. The captain and the remaining 70 crew members maneuvered Monte Cervantes onto a rock reef (the Les Eclaireur islets), where they ran the ship aground in an attempt to prevent her from sinking. The forecastle, still freely floating in the water, listed ever more steeply; the ship by this time was already flooded up to D-deck. Sounding line measurements showed that the steamer sat with only the port side of her stern resting on the reef. The remainder of the ship floated freely in the water. Further measurements showed a continuous penetration of water into the hull, and at this time the captain ordered that all remaining crew on board abandon ship using the last remaining lifeboat. The senior officers spent the night of 22 January on a nearby rock islet.

=== Next day ===
In the morning of the following day, 23 January, numerous ships, among them Vincente Fidel Lopez, headed to Monte Cervantes in order to assist with taking the remaining luggage items on board. Subsequently, the luggage transporter tried to tow Monte Cervantes, but this effort failed due to the insufficient engine power of the Argentine ship, only 450 horsepower (336 kilowatts). As evening approached Captain Dreyer sent the remaining crew ashore. He wanted to remain on the ship, which he believed would hold its position. The steward could not persuade him to leave. Meanwhile, two other officers climbed back on board to retrieve some items.

=== Monte Cervantes sinks ===
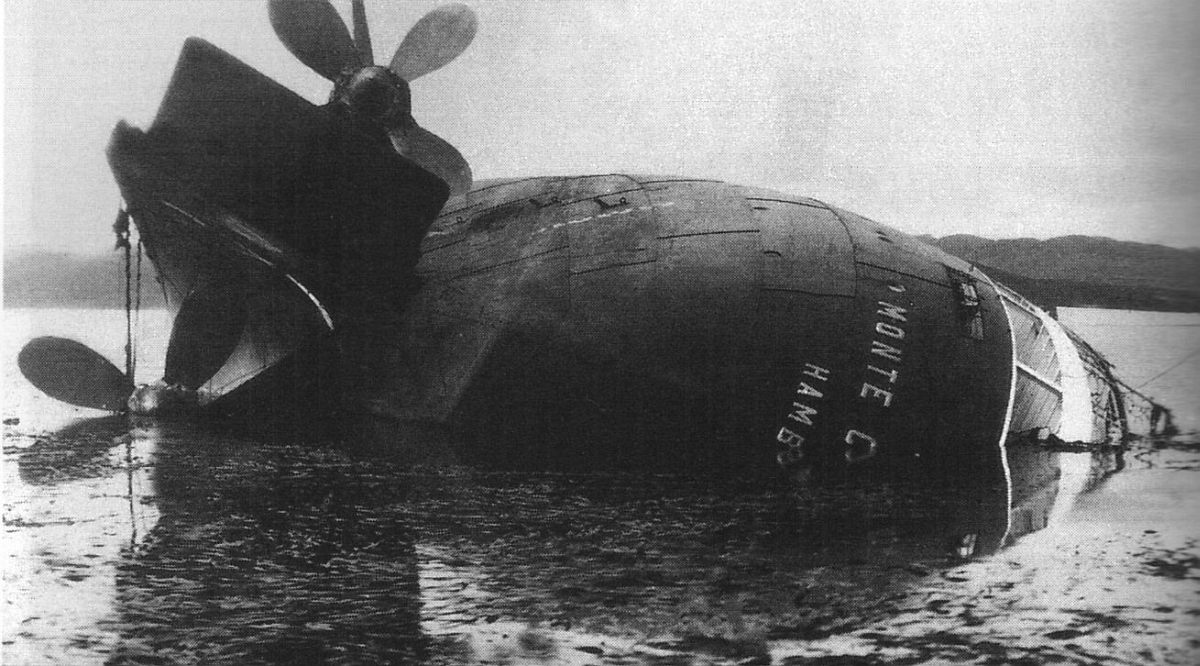
The stern of Monte Cervantes, still above the waterline

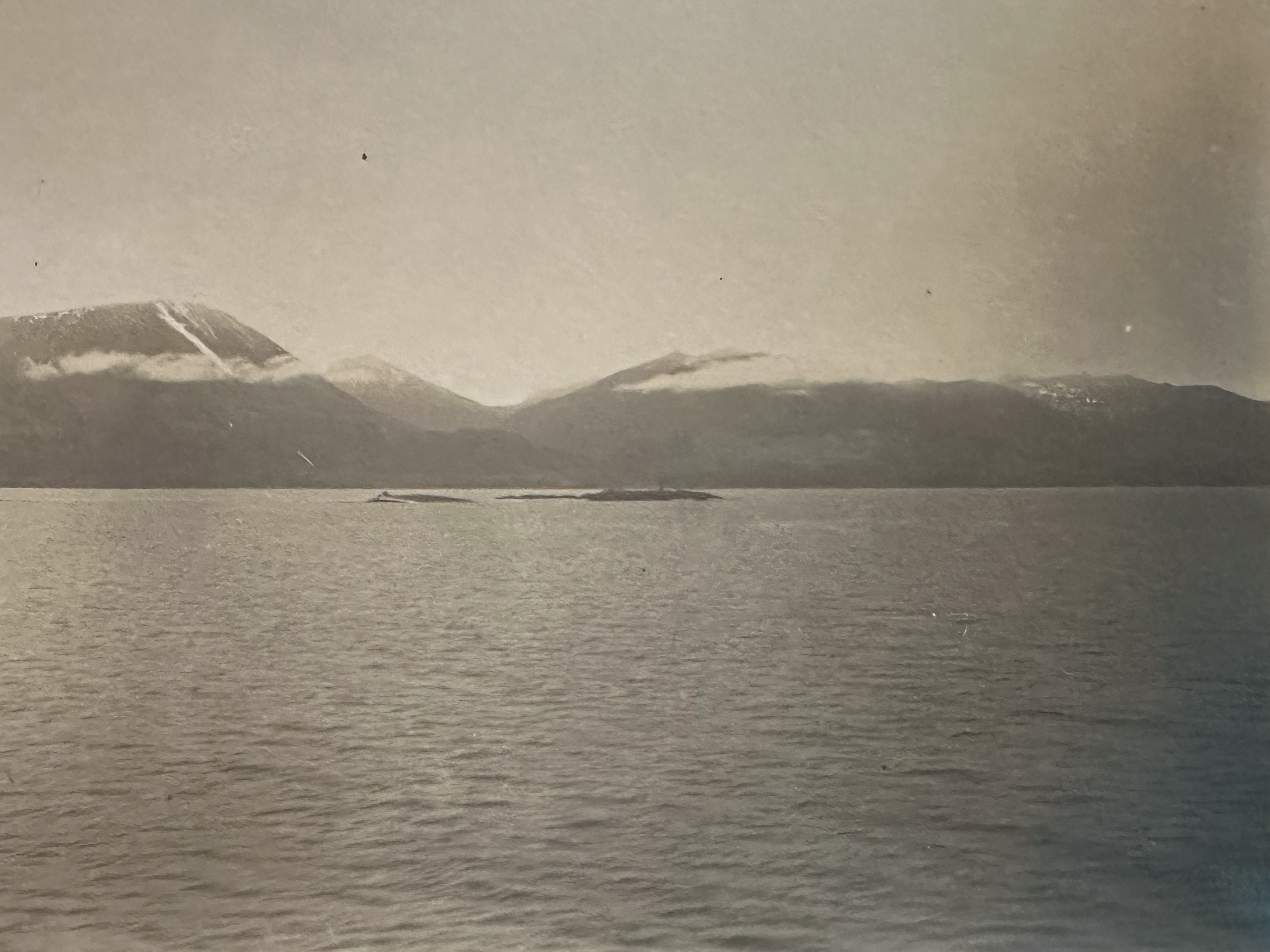
The tomb of the Monte Cervantes, january 1930

Shortly thereafter a strong tremor traveled throughout Monte Cervantes and the bow of the ship nosed over and began to sink. The crew jumped into the water and were saved by the waiting launch. However Captain Dreyer was unable to save himself. Wearing his life ring, he jumped and accidentally slipped into the open promenade area of the ship. He thus drowned in his own ship and became the only victim of the shipwreck. The launch searched for over an hour for Dreyer, but his body was never found. The stern of the ocean liner did not go under but remained visible from the sea. Since the ship rested on a rocky reef outside the normal shipping routes, no efforts were made to remove it.

=== Exoneration ===
On 6 March 1930, the marine court of Hamburg held an inquiry into the sinking of the Monte Cervantes "in the Beagle Passage of the Straits of Magellan." The verdict exonerated Captain Dreyer, who had lost his life.

== Salvage attempts ==
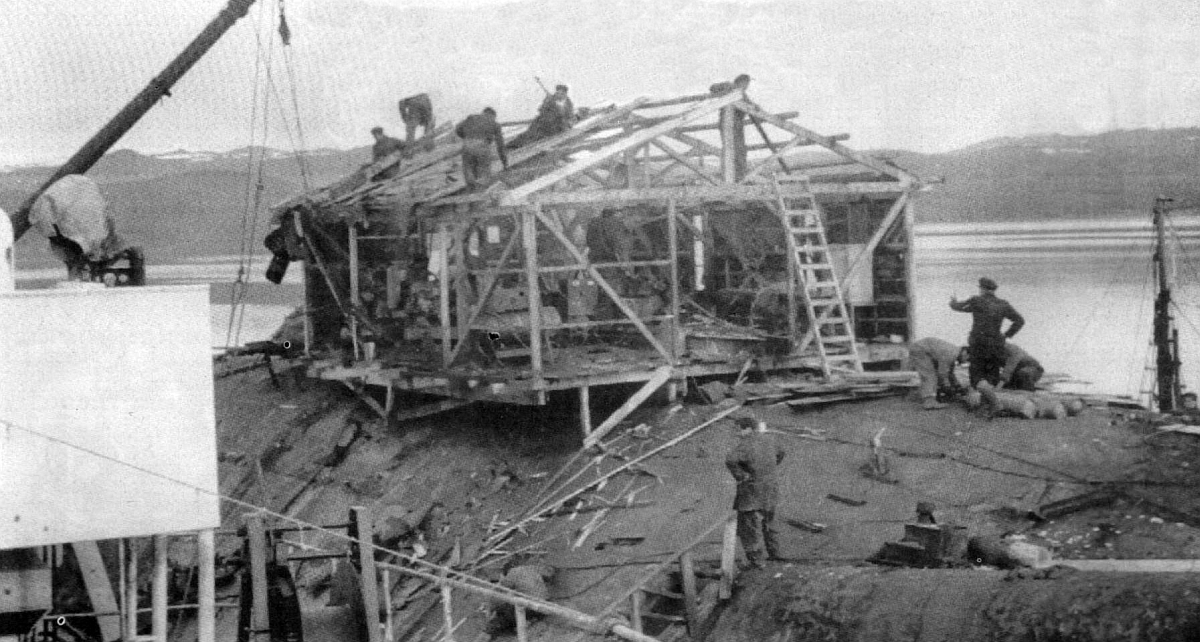
Workers construct a hut on the upturned hull of Monte Cervantes, in which they will live while salvage work is carried out

For more than 20 years the ship rested relatively securely on underwater rock. Metal prices rose after the Second World War, and in 1951 the Italian salvage company Salvamar ("Seasaver") secured the marine salvage rights at the wreck site. A complete salvage was impossible and thus the strategy was to remove piece by piece all usable metal parts to melt down and sell. In 1953 the rescue tug St. Christopher (formerly HMS Justice) was chartered to assist in the salvage operations. The tug herself ended up being beached and abandoned during the work and remains near Ushuaia today, a monument to the treacherous channel. In 1954 the attempt was begun to drag the wreck to Ushuaia where the more difficult dismantling could be undertaken. The salvage crew used floating devices to bring the ship back to the vertical. Finally the ship turned upright and slid off the reef, and on 14 October 1954 three tugboats began slowly pushing the remaining wreck to Ushuaia. However, when the little convoy had traveled less than a mile, the ship again listed to port and slowly slid beneath the water. Monte Cervantes irretrievably sank into the 130-meter (427-foot) depths of the Beagle Channel.

=== Rediscovery ===
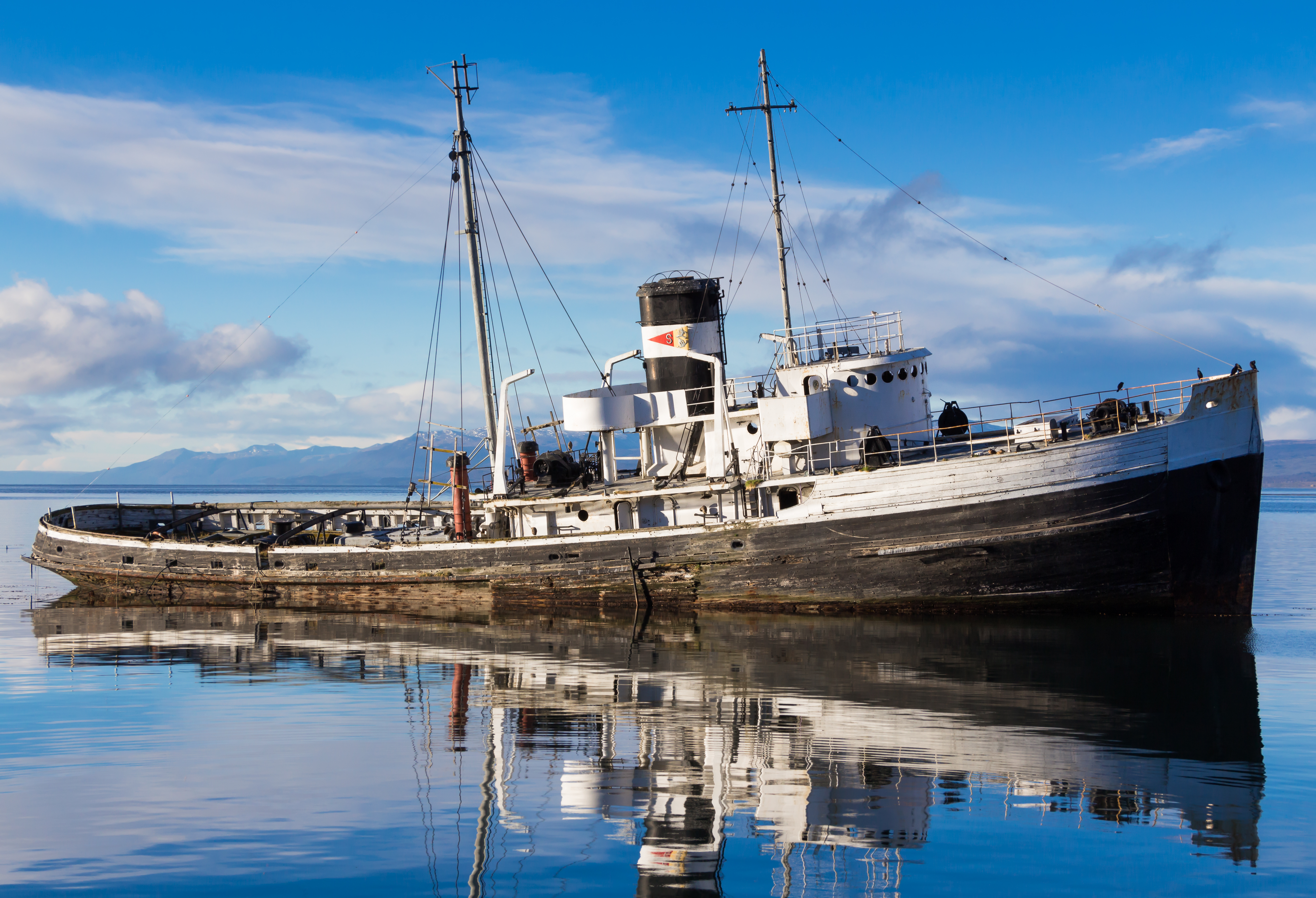
The wreck of the St. Christopher (2017)

In September 2000, a film team from Spiegel TV undertook an attempt to find the stern portion of the wreck of Monte Cervantes. The search was a success: the remnants of the former luxury liner were discovered 115 meters (377 feet) down. Employing a remotely operated vehicle (ROV), the hull of Monte Cervantes was penetrated for the first time in 70 years. Minor ornamental treasures were recovered, such as a bottle of red wine, wine glasses, ashtrays, and chandeliers, all of which are on display at the Museo del Fin del Mundo (Museum at the End of the World) in Ushuaia.

Today the Monte Cervantes wreck is a destination for scuba divers, near the ill-fated St. Christopher, now with grass growing on her decks.

== Recognition ==
The City of Montevideo honors the drowned Captain Dreyer with the Plaza Capitán Dreyer. In the Blankenese community in Hamburg, a 538-meter (1,765-foot) plaza commemorates Monte Cervantes.

== Media ==
- In 2001, Spiegel TV produced a one-hour documentary film titled Sunk Off Cape Horn: The Mystery of the Monte Cervantes. For this film, the aforementioned film footage plus photographs, statements of survivors, historical documents, and other evidence was used.
- The film Diving Into the Past: The Mystery of the Monte Cervantes ran on the German television station Phoenix on 14 June 2006.

== Books and periodicals ==
- Schiffe, Menschen, Schicksale ["Ships, Men, Fates"]; Ausgabe 79: Monte Cervantes - Ende vor Feuerland auf einer Felspitze
- Disaster at sea: the story of the world's great maritime tragedies by Otto Mielke. Published by Fleet Pub. Corp., 1958. 255 pages (Translation of Katastrophen auf See)
- Passenger ships of the world, past and present by Eugene Waldo Smith. 2nd Edition, published by G. H. Dean, 1963. 1097 pages [pages 429-430]
- Great passenger ships of the world by Arnold Kludas, Charles Hodges. Edition: illustrated. Published by Stephens, 1976
- The Krassin by Maurice Parijanine, Lawrence Brown. Translated by Lawrence Brown. Published by The Macaulay Co., 1929.
- Ships Monthly published by Endlebury Pub. Co., 1984. Item notes: v. 19, no. 3
- Trosečníci na kře ledové, (translation: Survivors on cold ice) (1928) by František Běhounek
