= SS Kirovograd =

German-built cargo steamship

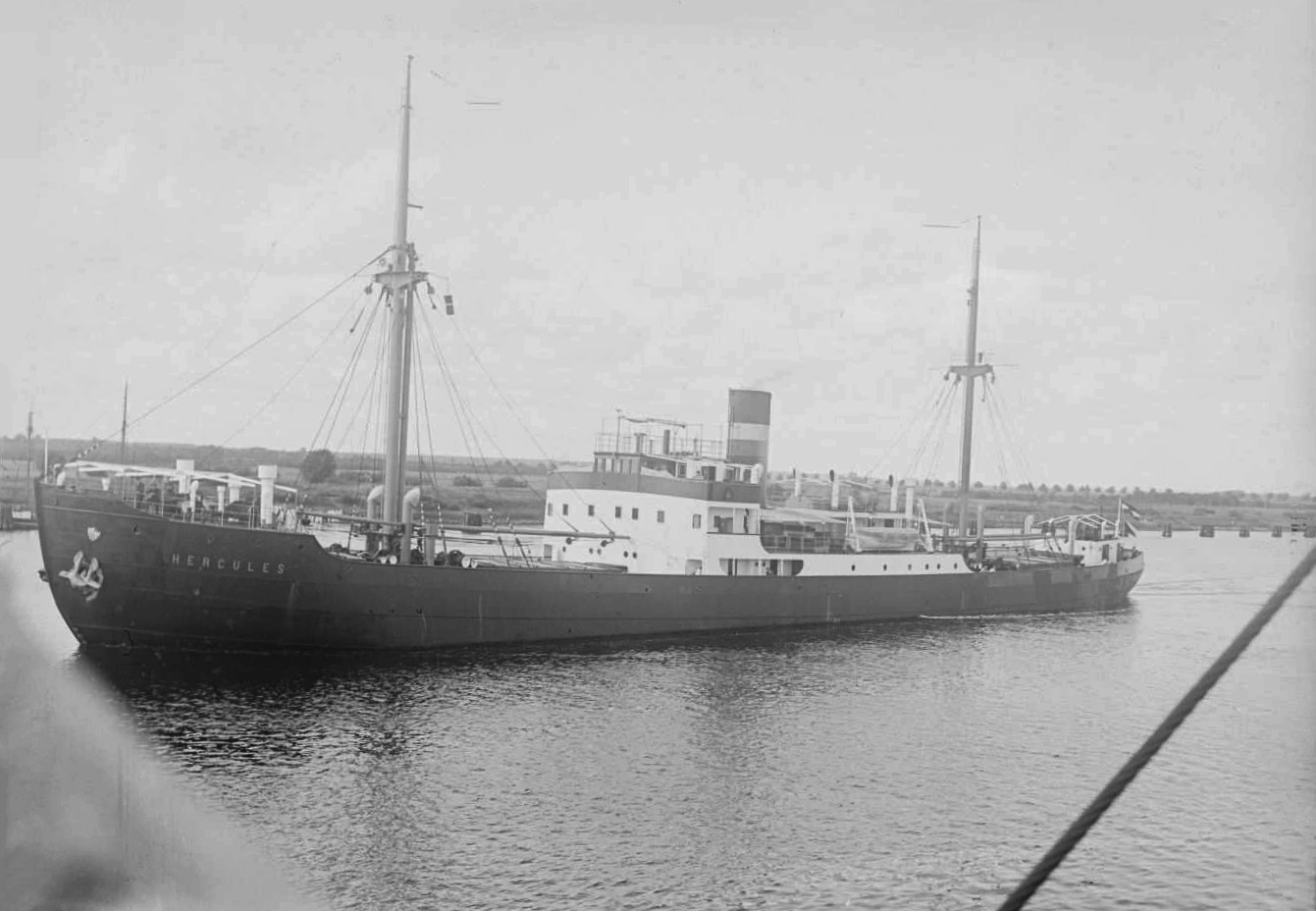
- The ship as Hercules

History
- Name: 1929: Hercules; 1945: Empire Dovey; 1946: Kirovograd
- Namesake: 1929: Hercules; 1945: River Dyfi; 1946: Kirovograd
- Owner: 1929: DG „Neptun“; 1945: Ministry of War Transport; 1945: Ministry of Transport; 1946: USSR
- Operator: 1940: Kriegsmarine; 1941: Kriegsmarine
- Port of registry: 1929: (Weimar Republic) Bremen; 1935: (Nazi Germany) Bremen; 1945: (United Kingdom) London; 1946: (Soviet Union) Leningrad; by 1965: (Soviet Union) Archangel
- Builder: AG Weser, Bremen
- Yard number: 875
- Completed: 1929
- Identification: 1929: code letters QMJN; by 1934: call sign DONX; 1945: UK official number 180601; 1945: call sign GDYV
- Fate: Scrapped in 1968

General characteristics
- Class & type: Helios-class cargo ship
- Tonnage: 2,883 GRT, 1,616 NRT
- Length: 296.9 ft (90.5 m) registered
- Beam: 46.0 ft (14.0 m)
- Depth: 23.3 ft (7.1 m)
- Decks: 2
- Installed power: 1 × triple-expansion engine + exhaust steam turbine: 180 NHP, 1,170 ihp
- Propulsion: 1 × screw
- Sensors & processing systems: as built: submarine signalling; by 1934: as above, plus wireless direction finding
- Notes: sister ships: Helios, Hermes, Hestia

SS Kirovograd (Russian: Кировоград) was a steel-hulled cargo steamship. She was built in Germany in 1929 for Dampfschifffahrts-Gesellschaft „Neptun“ as Hercules. In the Second World War, the Kriegsmarine requisitioned her twice: in 1940, and again in 1941. In 1945 the United Kingdom seized her as war reparations, and renamed her Empire Dovey. In 1946 she was transferred to the Soviet Union, which renamed her Kirovograd. She was scrapped in West Germany in 1968.

She was the third of five DG „Neptun“ ships to be named after the ancient Roman divine hero Hercules. The first was a steamship that was built in 1888 and sank in 1889. The second was a steel-hulled steamship that was built in 1903, surrendered to France in 1921 and renamed Tordis, later renamed Marie-Louise Le Borgne, and scrapped in 1954 or 1955. The fourth was a motor ship that was built in 1950, and sold in 1960 to Yugoslavian owners. The fifth was a motor ship that was built in 1965, sold in 1972 and renamed Neptun Hercules, and scrapped in 1988.

== Helios-class cargo ships ==
In 1929, AG Weser in Bremen built a class of four cargo steamships for DG „Neptun“ (the "Neptune Steamship Company"). Yard number 874 was launched as Helios; 875 as Hercules; 876 as Hermes; and 877 as Hestia. They were based on the Ajax class that AG „Weser“ had built for DG „Neptun“ in 1927; but with increased cargo capacity, and an innovative new bow design.

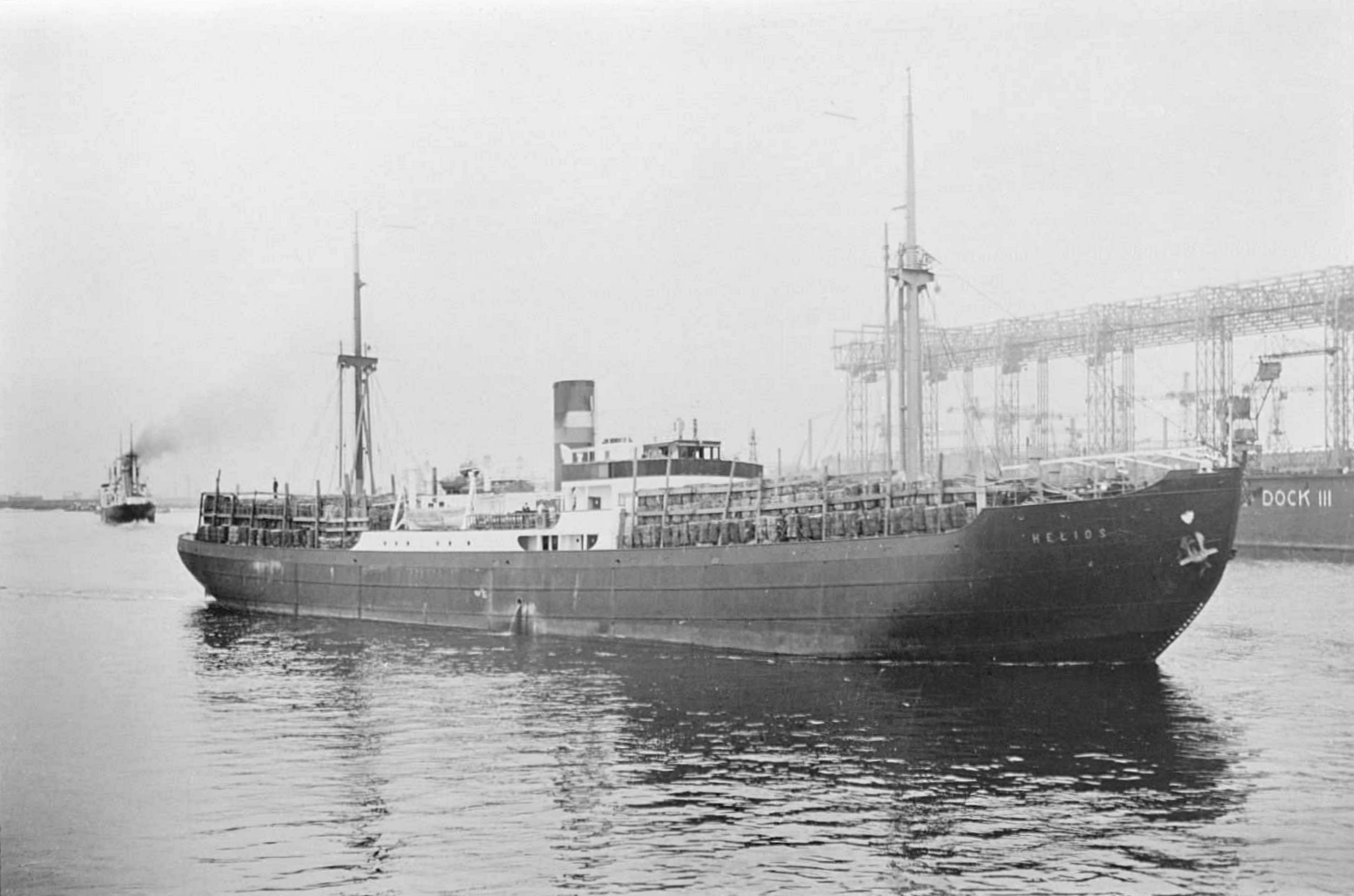
Helios, one of Hercules' sister ships, showing her Maierform bow shape

The Helios class had a depth of 23.3 ft (7.1 m) instead of 15.3 ft (4.7 m); and a registered length of 296.9 ft (90.5 m) instead of 287 ft (87 m). The extra length was because the new ships had a Maierform bow, designed by Erich Maier at the recently-founded Maierform GmbH in Bremen. But they had the same propulsion system as the Ajax class: a single screw, driven by a three-cylinder triple-expansion engine plus a Bauer-Wach exhaust steam turbine.

== Hercules ==
Hercules' registered length was 296.9 ft (90.5 m), her beam was 46.0 ft (14.0 m), and her depth was 23.3 ft (7.1 m). Her tonnages were 2,883 GRT, 1,616 NRT. The combined power of her reciprocating engine plus her turbine was rated at 180 NHP, or 1,170 ihp. She was equipped with submarine signalling. DG „Neptun“ registered her at Bremen. Her code letters were QMJN. By 1934, wireless direction finding had been added to her navigation equipment; her wireless telegraph call sign was DONX; and this had superseded her code letters.

The Kriegsmarine requisitioned Hercules in 1940, and returned her to her owners later that year. The Kriegsmarine requisitioned her a second time in 1941, and returned her again in 1942. In May 1945, the Allies seized her at Copenhagen. On 23 June she was declared a war prize, along with her cargo, which included 1½ tons of grease, which was sold by public tender in January 1946.

== Empire Dovey and Kirovograd ==
The Ministry of War Transport took ownership of Hercules, and renamed her Empire Dovey, after the River Dyfi (anglicised to Dovey) in mid-Wales. She was registered in London; her UK official number was 180601; and her call sign was GDYV.

In February 1946, Empire Dovey was transferred to the Soviet Union under the Potsdam Agreement. She was renamed Kirovograd, after the city of that name (now called Kropyvnytskyi) in what was then the Ukrainian Soviet Socialist Republic. She was registered in Leningrad (now St Petersburg).

On 11 July 1960, Kirovograd collided with the motor barge Gladys in the Medway Estuary off the Isle of Grain, Kent, England. The barge sank.

By 1965, Kirovograd's registration had been transferred from Leningrad to Archangel. She was scrapped in West Germany in 1968.

== Bibliography ==
- Lloyd's Register of British and Foreign Shipping. Vol. I.–Steamers. London: Lloyd's Register of Shipping. 1903 – via Internet Archive.
- Lloyd's Register of Shipping. Vol. II.–Steamers. London: Lloyd's Register of Shipping. 1921 – via Internet Archive.
- Lloyd's Register of Shipping. Vol. II.–Steamers and Motorships of 300 Tons Gross and Over. London: Lloyd's Register of Shipping. 1930 – via Southampton City Council.
- Lloyd's Register of Shipping. Vol. II.–Steamers and Motorships of 300 Tons Gross and Over. London: Lloyd's Register of Shipping. 1934 – via Southampton City Council.
- Lloyd's Register of Shipping. Vol. II.–Steamers and Motorships of 300 Tons Gross and Over. London: Lloyd's Register of Shipping. 1945 – via Southampton City Council.
- Mitchell, WH; Sawyer, LA (1995). The Empire Ships (2nd ed.). London, New York, Hamburg, Hong Kong: Lloyd's of London Press Ltd. ISBN 1-85044-275-4.
- Register Book. Vol. I A–L. London: Lloyd's Register of Shipping. 1952 – via Internet Archive.
- Register Book. Vol. II M–Z. London: Lloyd's Register of Shipping. 1954 – via Internet Archive.
- Register Book. Vol. I Register of Ships. London: Lloyd's Register of Shipping. 1965.
- Register Book. Vol. Register of Ships A–L. London: Lloyd's Register of Shipping. 1966 – via Internet Archive.
- Register of Ships. Vol. M–Z. London: Lloyd's Register of Shipping. 1976.
- Universal Register. London: Lloyd's Register of British and Foreign Shipping. 1889 – via Internet Archive.
