= MV Krasnodar (1925) =

History
- Name: Skåneland (1925-28); Pernambuco (1928-45); Empire Dart (1945-46); Krasnodar (1946-75)
- Owner: Angfartyg AB Tirfing (1925-28); Hamburg-Südamerikanische Dampfschiffahrts-Gesellschaft (1928-45); Ministry of War Transport (1945); Ministry of Transport (1945-46); Soviet Government (1946-75)
- Operator: Angfartyg AB Tirfing (1925-28); Hamburg-Südamerikanische Dampfschiffahrts-Gesellschaft (1928-45); F Carrick & Co Ltd(1945-46); Counties Ship Management Ltd (1946-58); Soviet Government (1946-75)
- Port of registry: (Sweden) Göthenburg (1925-28); (Weimar Republic) Hamburg (1928-33); (Germany) Hamburg (1933-45); (United Kingdom) London (1945-46); Soviet Union (1946-75)
- Route: Germany - Brazil (1928-39)
- Builder: Kockums Mekaniska Verkstad
- Yard number: 146
- Launched: 1925
- Completed: November 1925
- Out of service: 1975
- Identification: United Kingdom Official Number 180705 (1945-46); Code Letters GNWV (1945-46); IMO number: 5196438 ( -1975)
- Fate: Scrapped

General characteristics
- Type: Cargo ship
- Tonnage: 4,121 GRT (1925-45); 4,186 GRT (1945-75); 2,462 NRT; 7,654 DWT
- Length: 113.69 m (373 ft 0 in)
- Beam: 16.43 m (53 ft 11 in)
- Depth: 6.88 m (22 ft 7 in)
- Propulsion: Diesel engine
- Speed: 12 knots (22 km/h)

Krasnodar (Краснода́р) was a 4,186 GRT cargo ship that was built in 1925 as Skåneland by Kockums Mekaniska Verkstad, Malmö, Sweden for Swedish owners. In 1928, she was sold to Germany and renamed Pernambuco. She was seized as a war prize in 1945, passing to the Ministry of War Transport (MoWT) and being renamed Empire Dart. In 1946, she was transferred to the Soviet Union and was renamed Krasnodar, serving until she was scrapped in 1975.

== Description ==
The ship was built in 1925 by Kockums Mekaniska Verkstad, Malmö. She was yard number 146.

The ship was 113.69 metres (373 ft 0 in) long, with a beam of 16.43 metres (53 ft 11 in). She had a depth of 6.88 metres (22 ft 7 in). She was assessed at 4,121 GRT. 2,462 NRT. Her DWT was 7,654.

The ship was propelled by a 438 nhp diesel engine. It could propel her at 12 knots (22 km/h).

== History ==
Skåneland was built in 1925 for Angfartyg AB Tirfing, Gothenburg. She was completed in November that year.

In 1928, Skåneland was sold to Hamburg-Südamerikanische Dampfschiffahrts-Gesellschaft (Hamburg Süd, English: Hamburg-South America Line), Hamburg, Germany and renamed Pernambuco, the third ship of that name to serve with Hamburg Süd. She operated on the Germany - Brazil route, as shown by a voyage made between May and August 1933. Departing from Hamburg, she called at Antwerp, Belgium, then Pernambuco, Bahia, Paranaguá, São Francisco do Sul, Florianópolis, Pelotas and Porto Alegre.

Pernambuco was seized at Kiel in May 1945 as a prize of war by British Forces. Pernambuco was passed to the MoWT and renamed Empire Dart. She was assessed as 4,186 GRT. The United Kingdom Official Number 180705 and Code Letters GNWV were allocated. Her port of registry was London. She was operated under the management of F Carrick & Co Ltd, Newcastle upon Tyne.

In 1946, Empire Dart was transferred to the Soviet Government and was renamed Krasnodar (Cyrillic: Краснода́р). In 1956, Krasnodar was one of six Soviet ships that opened a new route to Bombay, India. With the introduction of IMO Numbers in the 1960s, Krasnodar was allocated the number 5196438. She served until 1975 and was scrapped at Split, Yugoslavia in April 1975.
