= Montrose =

Montrose may refer to:

== Places ==
=== Scotland ===
- Montrose, Angus (the original after which all others ultimately named or derived)
  - Montrose Academy, the secondary school in Montrose
- Montrose (Parliament of Scotland constituency), pre-1707

=== Australia ===
- Montrose, Queensland (Southern Downs Region), a locality in the Southern Downs Region
- Montrose, Queensland (Western Downs Region), a locality in the Western Downs Region
- Montrose, Tasmania, a suburb of Hobart
- Montrose, Victoria, a suburb of Melbourne

=== Canada ===
- Montrose, British Columbia
- Montrose (Edmonton), neighbourhood in Edmonton, Alberta
- Rural Municipality of Montrose No. 315, Saskatchewan
- Montrose, Nova Scotia

=== Republic of Ireland ===
- Montrose, Dublin, an area where the national television station RTÉ broadcasts from; use of the term "Montrose" often metonymically refers to RTÉ and not the area

=== United States ===
- Montrose, Alabama
- Montrose, Arkansas
- Montrose, California
- Montrose, Colorado
  - Montrose Botanic Gardens, gardens in Montrose, Colorado
- Montrose, Georgia
- Montrose, Illinois
- Montrose, Iowa
- Montrose, Kansas
- Montrose (Clarksville, Maryland), on the list of RHPs in MD
- Montrose, Michigan
- Montrose, Minnesota
- Montrose, Mississippi
- Montrose, Missouri
- Montrose (Holly Springs, Mississippi), a Mississippi Landmark
- Montrose, Nebraska
- Montrose, New Jersey
- Montrose, New York
- Montrose (Hillsborough, North Carolina), on the list of RHPs in NC
- Montrose-Ghent, Ohio
- Montrose, Ohio
- Montrose, Pennsylvania
- Montrose, South Dakota
- Montrose, Houston, a neighborhood in Houston, Texas
- Montrose, Virginia
- Montrose, West Virginia
- Montrose, Wisconsin, a town
  - Montrose (community), Wisconsin, an unincorporated community
- Montrose Avenue, a major street on the north side of Chicago
- Montrose County, Colorado
- Montrose Township (disambiguation)

=== Trinidad and Tobago ===
- Montrose, Trinidad and Tobago, a town in the Trinidad borough of Chaguanas

== Music ==
- Montrose (band), American hard rock/heavy metal band
  - Montrose (album), their 1973 self-titled debut album
- "Montrose", a traditional song about James Graham, 1st Marquess of Montrose, recorded by (among others) Steeleye Span on the 1978 album Live at Last
- "Montrose", a song by Man Overboard from the 2010 album Real Talk
- "Montrose", a song by Weyes Blood from the 2014 album The Innocents

== Military and naval ==
- HMS Montrose, ships of the United Kingdom's Royal Navy
- RAF Montrose, a Royal Air Force station in Scotland
- SS Montrose, several civilian vessels
- USS Montrose (APA/LPA-212), a Haskell-class attack transport of the US Navy in World War II, the Korean War and Vietnam War

== Other uses ==
- Montrose (horse), winner of the Kentucky Derby in 1887
- Montrose (McKenney, Virginia), a historic farmhouse on the U.S. National Register of Historic Places
- Montrose (surname)
- Montrose Chemical Corporation of California
- Montrose F.C., Scottish football team
- Château Montrose, French Bordeaux wine producer, archaically named simply Montrose
- Duke of Montrose, Scottish title

== See also ==
- Montrose station (disambiguation)
- James Graham, 1st Marquess of Montrose (1612–1650), Scottish nobleman and soldier
- Montross (disambiguation)
- Monterosa (disambiguation)
- Monte Rosa (disambiguation)
