= Mandy Horvath =

American bi-lateral above knee amputee (born 1993)

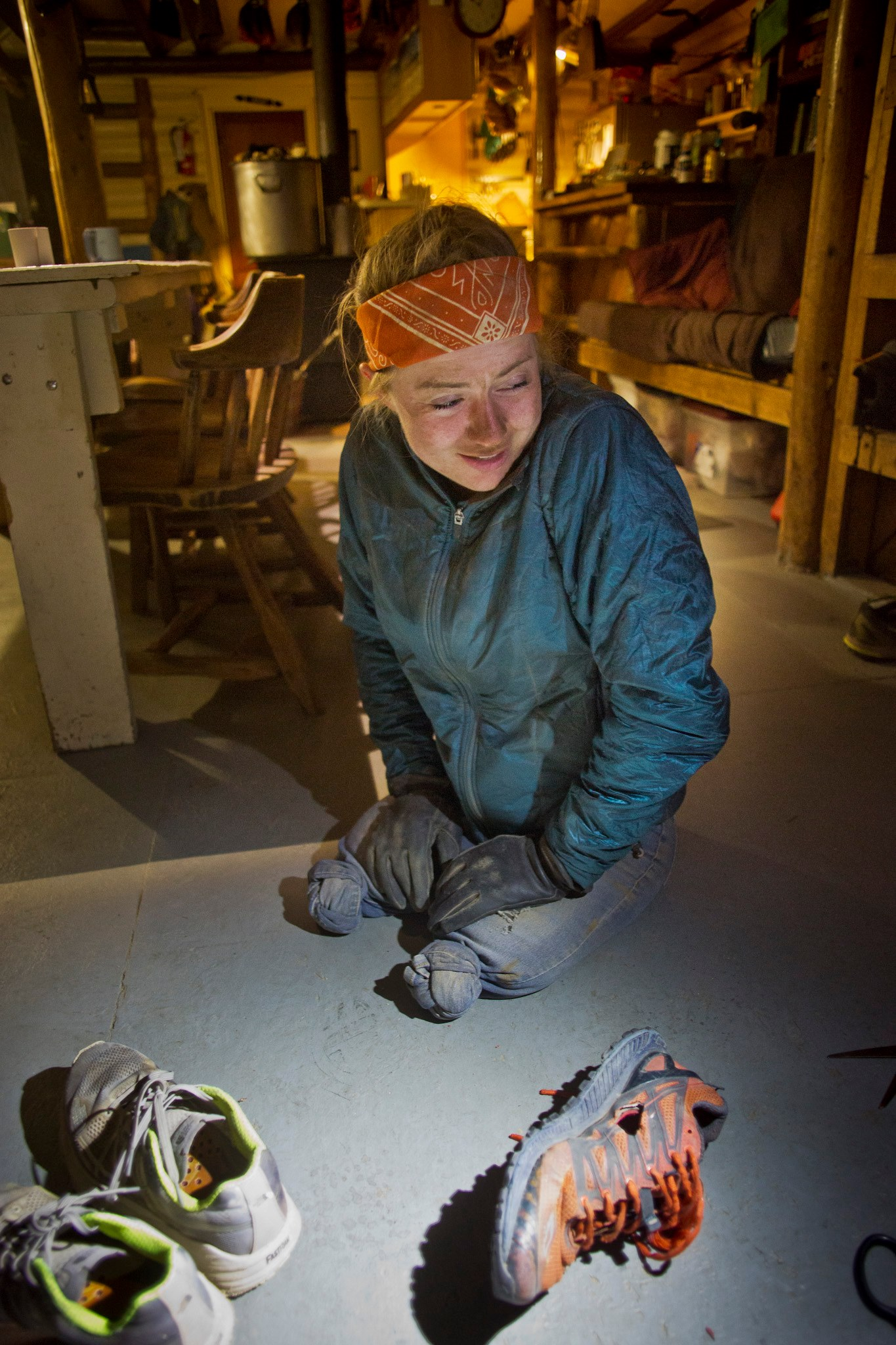
- Horvath resting at Barr Camp in 2018.
- Born: June 10, 1993 (age 33); Smithville, Missouri, U.S.
- Education: University of Colorado, Colorado Springs
- Occupations: Creative writer, public speaker, actress, mountaineer
- Known for: First legless woman to summit one of the world's Eight Summits without the aid of prosthetic equipment
- Awards: Pioneering Achievement Award (2022)

Mandy Horvath (born June 10, 1993) is a Colorado-based American bi-lateral above knee amputee, creative writer, public speaker, actress and mountaineer. She is notable as the first female bi-lateral amputee to summit the Manitou Incline, Pikes Peak (twice), the Statue of Liberty stairwell to the crown, and Tanzania's Mount Kilimanjaro, without the use of prosthetic equipment- using her arms and hands to crawl. Her successful ascent of Mount Kilimanjaro also awards her title of the first legless woman to summit one of the world's Eight Summits without the aid of prosthetic equipment.

Horvath was struck by a locomotive in July 2014, severing her lower extremities from her body above the knee.

Mandy is also known for her candid insights to her life as an amputee in television appearances, radio, press, film, and creative writing. She went internationally viral in 2017, and in 2019, for her creatively written profiles on the popular dating platform, Tinder.

== Early life and education ==
Mandy was born in Missouri, June 10, 1993. The older of two children, she was raised by her parents, in the North Kansas City suburb of Smithville, MO. She graduated high-school at the age of 16, and started working in the culinary industry prior to the incident that resulted in her amputations. In 2016 she relocated to Colorado Springs, Colorado, and became a collegiate student at UCCS, The University of Colorado, Colorado Springs.

== Amputations ==
On July 26, 2014, Mandy was struck by a locomotive near a bar in Steele City, Nebraska. After consuming two beers and two shots while playing pool inside the tavern throughout the evening, she walked outside and blacked out, regaining consciousness in an ambulance with no lower extremities. She believes she was incapacitated by a date rape drug, but was woken from a medically induced coma several days later without the ability to test for the drugs in her system. The authorities had written the incident off as a suicide attempt. Horvath's date of that night suspiciously died of carbon monoxide poisoning, just a few months later that year. He was found deceased within the cab of a vehicle, in a closed garage. The authorities labelled his death an accident despite his profession as a heavy equipment operator. Nearly a year into recovery from the initial trauma, Horvath was set back again, having to be re-amputated due to a rare form of bone regeneration.

== Prosthesis ==
In December 2020, Mandy Horvath was fitted for prosthetic legs by prosthetist Stan Patterson at Prosthetics and Orthotics Association (POA), in Orlando, Florida on behalf of the 50Legs Charity Organization, founded by former pro-wrestler, Steve Chamberland.

== Mountaineering career ==
=== Manitou incline ===
April 23, 2018, Mandy Horvath became the first female bi-lateral above knee amputee to ascend the Manitou Incline without the use of prosthetic equipment in an effort to raise awareness for Limb loss Awareness Month. Horvath's first ascent took 5 hours and she was carried down Barr Trail by 2 that accompanied her.

=== Pikes Peak 2018 ===
On the evening of June 10, 2018, Horvath's 25th birthday, she and Daniel Pond, a mountaineering guide and marine veteran, began their ascent of Pikes Peak, from the base of the Manitou Incline. June 13, 2018: 74 Hours later, crawling all 13 miles of Barr Trail unassisted by carrying, experiencing severe inflammation to her hands, a delayed hypersensitive reaction to the alpine region's wildflowers, and a myriad of weather, she and Pond safely ascended to the 14,115 ft summit of Pikes Peak, becoming the first bi-lateral amputee ever to do so without the aid of prosthetic equipment. Met at the summit by a crowd of cheering spectators, she was embraced by her parents and her younger sibling. The climb was devoted to fundraising for two veteran non-profit organizations: The Battle Buddy Foundation, and Operation Ward 57.

=== Pikes Peak 2019 ===
In August 2019, Mandy led fellow bi-lateral amputee and Army veteran, SGT Travis Strong, up Barr Trail to ascend Pikes Peak. Strong was injured in 2006, in an explosion that occurred in Baghdad. Inspired by Horvath to go further, the pair labelled themselves the "Legless Legends," and dedicated the climb to raising awareness for the veteran non-profit, Cars4Heroes.org. An organization dedicated to providing reliable transportation to veterans and their families. On the evening of August 18, 2019, Ms. Horvath safely made her second ascent of Pikes Peak, and Strong made his first, making him the first male bi-lateral amputee to climb Pikes Peak without the aid of prosthetic equipment. Promptly after descending the mountain, the two were able to donate a vehicle to a local veteran on behalf of the non-profit in Manitou Springs.

=== Statue of Liberty 2019 ===
September 28, 2019, Mandy became the first recorded bi-lateral amputee to crawl up the steps of the Statue of Liberty to the crown, without the aid of prosthetic equipment. A video of her ascending the stairs to be greeted by Park Rangers went viral, and she utilized the notoriety to raise awareness for veteran non-profit, Cars4Heroes.

=== Mount Kilimanjaro 2021 ===
Mandy Horvath also became the first woman in recorded history to summit one of the world's Eight Summits, Mount Kilimanjaro, by crawling, on June 16, 2021. In an interview prior to the attempt, Horvath said she had an estimated 40 pairs of gloves and expected the climb to take 10–14 days depending on weather and other factors. The ascent began on her 28th birthday, and took her 6 days to reach the summit of Kilimanjaro's tallest point, Uruhu Peak. She was accompanied by a team of guides known as Ahsante Tours, and assisted by a leader of the group, Julius John White, in hazardous areas. Ms. Horvath was also accompanied by a team of documentarians. The climb was dedicated to benefitting the efforts of Conservation Through Tourism, an organization located in Moshi, Tanzania.

== Personal life ==
After the 2014 incident that resulted in Horvath's limb loss, she struggled with unanswered questions, depression, PTSD and alcoholism.

On August 15, 2018, Horvath went viral for her arrest. Just two months after her first ascent of Pikes Peak, she was arrested for second degree assault, driving under the influence (DUI), and DUI with an excessive blood alcohol content (BAC). It was her third arrest within six months for suspicion of DUI.

Horvath, in 2021, was reported 3 years sober and in compliance of all her court related consequences from the arrest in 2018.

== Creative writing ==
In 2017 Mandy was praised for publishing a creatively written biography on the popular dating platform, Tinder. In which, she utilizes humor to cope with trauma and sexualizes her disability. The profile went internationally viral, The Chive titled her a "beautiful badass", and HuffPost labelled the writing "pure genius". Horvath was inspired by a disability dating activist. Despite dating men from the popular app, she is still single. Horvath went viral again in her 2019 return to the dating app, with a new creatively written biography that Yahoo! called "more hilarious than ever".

== Television appearances and filmography ==
=== Television ===
Horvath first made her debut to television in a 2017 episode of The Doctors talk show, sharing details of the incident that resulted in her amputations.

In 2018 she was a featured guest in an episode of Megyn Kelly Today, where she recounted the details of her amputations, discussed her recovery, and was commended for her successful ascent of Pikes Peak.

Mandy was also featured in an episode of Inside Edition in December 2020, in which she again recounted the train incident, showcased various achievements, opened up about her arrest in 2018, her sobriety since, and announced her plan to climb Mount Kilimanjaro.

Horvath appeared in a Season 18 episode of Naked and Afraid on March 9, 2025, and completed the 21 day challenge in a remote Belize jungle.

Year	Title	Role
2017	The Doctors	Self
2018	Megyn Kelly Today	Self
2020	Inside Edition	Self
2025	Naked And Afraid	Self

=== Work in filmography ===
Horvath filmed with a team of documentarians in 2021. Producers- Francis Cronin, Edward John Drake, and cinemaphotographer Laffrey Witbrod. The filmmakers summited Mount Kilimanjaro alongside Horvath and the Ahsante Tours team; the forthcoming documentary, with a working title changed from "Life Climb," to "Mandy Lady," details Mandy's life story and captures her ascent of Mount Kilimanjaro. The documentary is currently in post-production.

Year	Title	Genre	Role
2021	"Life Climb / Mandy Lady"	Documentary (Post-Production)	Self

== Awards ==
On behalf of the Amelia Earhart Foundation, Ms. Horvath has been announced the 2022 Pioneering Achievement Award beneficiary. The award is annually gifted to women who epitomize the being of Amelia Earhart, at the Amelia Earhart Festival.
