= Fred Barr =

Trail blazer (1882–1940)

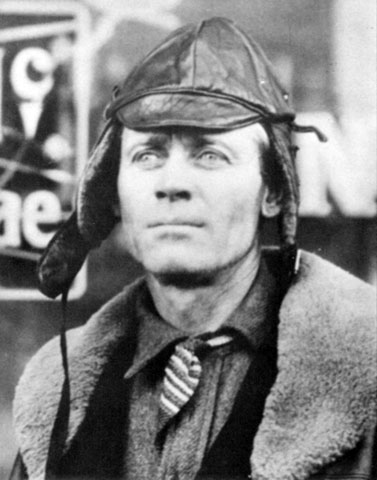
- Fred W. Barr
- Born: June 1882; Arkansas
- Died: April 2, 1940 (aged 57); Colorado

Fred W. Barr (1882-1940) ran a burro train business to Pikes Peak, but was known for his work blazing trails. He developed Barr Trail, built Barr Camp, and created other trails in the Pikes Peak area.

== Early life ==
Barr was born in June 1882 in Arkansas. He was the oldest child born to William and Mary Wade Barr. His five siblings were girls. His family moved to Colorado when he was eleven. They lived in Colorado City (now Old Colorado City) in 1900 and from 1904 to 1925 operated their business and lived at what is now 32nd Street and West Colorado Avenue. William Barr died in 1922.

== Burro transportation operator and trail blazer ==
At a young age, Barr rode along on stagecoaches that stopped at his grandfather, Joel H. Wade's stagecoach stop. They drove through the mountains from Cheyenne Mountain to Cripple Creek. Wade had moved into Cheyenne Canyon in 1885. Barr and his father ran a burro train and carriage business on West Colorado Avenue in Colorado City. They guided tourists through Garden of the Gods and Manitou by 1900. Barr had a stand at the Colorado Springs and Interurban Railway station at Garden of the Gods. He supervised "fine teams and excellent drivers" and led one of the teams. Tourists could visit Glen Eyrie, Garden of the Gods, Williams Canyon, Cave of the Winds, and High Drive. In 1913, William Barr was injured and his arm amputated at the shoulder after a railway car ran into his carriage. A woman passenger had a significant head injury when the carriage had overturned. Father and son operated the burro business at least through 1916. During that time, competition at the Railway station stand could result in altercations with competitors, resulting in judgments and fines.

There was a transitional period during Fred Barr worked at the livery business and from 1911 he had a contract for a burro concession station from the top of the Manitou Incline. Barr built a trail to the summit of Pikes Peak and after 1908 they took passengers on burro rides to the peak on his trail. He had a cabin above the Manitou Incline and later guided people on rides from there to the summit. Eric Swap postulates that Barr likely took his customers along the Fremont Trail, built in 1871 during a survey for the Denver and Rio Grande Western Railroad, but was not completed above the timberline at that time.

A trail was first created by a prospector in the mid-1800s, but the trail did not allow for travel by burro from Mount Manitou to the summit of Pikes Peak. This was because early trails did to go above the timber line, so the terrain was difficult to navigate over rocks and boulders. Beginning in 1914, Fred Barr built the burro trail, with a maximum 12% grade to the top of the peak for his burro train business. Aside from his work on the major portion of the trail, he supervised a crew of ten men for the U.S. Forest Service in 1917 who built the portion of the trail from the top of the Manitou Incline down to Manitou Springs. (Note: The History for Barr Camp states that Civilian Conservation Corps (CCC) workers completed the lower three miles from the trailhead to the top of Mount Manitou in the 1920s for the Forest Service.) He hired workers and worked on the trail himself. He hiked the entire trail and made it to the top of Pikes Peak on Christmas Eve, 1918, marking the completion of the survey for the trail. Barr Trail was completed in 1921. He also built trails to Bottomless Pit, Cameron Cone, The Crater, and the Oil Creek Tunnel on Pikes Peak.

Barr created a camp at 10,200 feet (3,100 m), first with tents in 1922 and then with a cabin so that tourists could camp overnight during the course of the trek to the summit from the Manitou Incline. To ring in the new year, Barr hiked with four other men along the Cog Railway tracks on December 31, 1922 and set off fireworks at midnight. They have continued the tradition, which continues to this day, where an additional hiker is added to each New Year's hike for the fireworks celebration at Pikes Peak. The group is called The AdAmAn Club.

Barr continued to operate tours up Barr Trail to Barr Camp and then the summit until his death in 1940. His business was sold and operated by successive owners until the 1960s.

An exhibit at the Manitou Springs Heritage Center documents his personal life as a husband and musician, his years as a burro train guide, and the impact that he made on the region with the development of trails and the Barr Camp site.

== Personal life ==
Barr had a wife named Anna and the couple had no children. He played the French Horn. Barr died in 1940 of a heart attack during a New Mexico vacation.
