= Monte Rosa (disambiguation) =

Monte Rosa, or Monte Rosa Massif, is a mountain massif of the Alps. The massif's highest mountain is sometimes called Monte Rosa.

Monte Rosa or Mount Rosa may also refer to:

- Dufourspitze, the second-highest mountain of the Alps, and highest point of the Monte Rosa massif
- Monte Rosa Hut, at the foot of Monte Rosa
- Monte Rosa Hotel, in Zermatt
- Monte Rosa, São Tomé and Príncipe, a village on the island of São Tomé
- Mount Rosa (Colorado), a mountain 9 mi (14 km) southwest of Colorado Springs, Colorado
- Mount Rosa (New Zealand), a mountain in the Southern Alps
- Institut Monte Rosa, in Montreux
- Monte Rosa Alpine Division, a pro-fascist Italian army unit raised by the short-lived Italian Social Republic during World War II
- MS Monte Rosa, a number of ships
- MV Monte Rosa, a German cruise ship launched in 1930; later known as the HMT Empire Windrush.

== See also ==
- Monterosa (disambiguation)
- Montrose (disambiguation)
