= Montrose (surname) =

Montrose is a surname. Notable people with the surname include:

- Belle Montrose (1886–1964), American actress and vaudeville performer
- Donald Montrose (1923–2008), American prelate
- Jack Montrose (1928–2006), American jazz tenor saxophonist
- Lewis Montrose (born 1988), English footballer
- Louis Montrose (born 1950), American literary theorist and academic scholar
- Ronnie Montrose (1947–2012), American guitarist
- Vikram Montrose (born 1987), Indian composer

== See also ==
- Duke of Montrose
- James Graham, 1st Marquess of Montrose (commonly called "the great Montrose")
- James Graham, 2nd Marquess of Montrose
- Montross (disambiguation), includes list of people with the surname
