= The AdAmAn Club =

Alpine club in Colorado state, United States

- Formation: 1922; 104 years ago
- Headquarters: Colorado Springs, Colorado, U.S.
- Members: 108
- Key people: Fred Morath, Ed Morath
- Website: adaman.org

The AdAmAn Club is an social club in the US state of Colorado. Founded in 1922, each year it fulfills a tradition of hiking to the summit of Pikes Peak on New Year's Eve and presenting a fireworks display visible to the city below. The members of the club are typically local mountaineers and are expected to push through very harsh winter conditions, including deep snow and strong winds, to reach the summit. The club is based in Colorado Springs, Colorado.

== History ==
Fred and Ed Morath had made winter climbs to the summit of Pikes Peak in 1920 and 1921 and came up with the idea of doing a watch party the following year, using fireworks. They worked with the Colorado Springs Gazette to sponsor and promote the event, then recruited three additional members (Fred Barr, Harry Standley, and Willis R. Magee). Fireworks were provided by John W. Garrett, a local businessman and news of the event spread around the country in various newspapers. The climbing party departed Manitou Springs at 6 a.m. on December 31, 1922, following the cog railway up the mountain. The temperature was noted as being 2 degrees below zero at the McReynolds halfway house and continued to drop as they climbed, accompanied by high winds. The group reached the summit house after eight hours and took shelter there from the blizzard conditions. At 9 p.m., the group was able to light a green flare, indicating that they were safely at the summit, and John Garrett lit fireworks from the roof of the Gazette as a response.

Despite the ongoing blizzard, the group was able to light their fireworks on the summit at midnight and subsequently became known as "The Frozen Five". They descended the next morning at 9:30 a.m. and arrived in Manitou Springs at 1:30 p.m. After the success of the event, they decided to officially form the club to make the fireworks show an annual tradition. They decided they would add a new member each year ("Add a Man") which led to the stylized name of "AdAmAn".

On New Year's Eve 1927, the club experienced a very intense storm with 75 mph winds and a temperature of 36 degrees below zero at the summit. Some of the club members experienced frostbite during the climb and were even swept off of their feet by the strong wind, forcing them to crawl at some points.

In 1930, the club fired a special rocket display in memory of explorer Roald Amundsen. The Norwegian arctic explorer had previously been made the club's first honorary member in 1926.

In 1933, arctic explorer Richard E. Byrd was invited to join the club as its second honorary member. Byrd accepted his invitation via radio transmission from his ship, the Jacob Ruppert, which was en route to Antarctica. While on the summit of Pikes Peak for New Year's Eve, the AdAmAn members launched fireworks that were visible for 100 miles and they also attempted to contact Admiral Byrd via radio transmission.

In 1967, Supreme Court Justice Leonard Sutton was invited to join the club as an honorary member.

In 1983, the club included a woman on a New Year's Eve climb for the first time in its history. The club, traditionally men-only, invited Sue Graham of Manitou Springs on the climb as a guest and later made her the club's first female member in 1997.

As of 2025, the club has grown to a membership of 108 and has also included 416 guest climbers who are not official members of the club. Individuals are invited each year to fill out an application to apply to become a guest climber.

== Notable Members ==
- Fred Barr (Charter)
- Carl Blaurock
- Willis R. Magee (Charter)
- Ed Morath (Charter)
- Fred Morath (Charter)
- Robert Ormes
- Harry Standley (Charter)
