= Eight Summits =

Grouping of highest continental mountain peaks

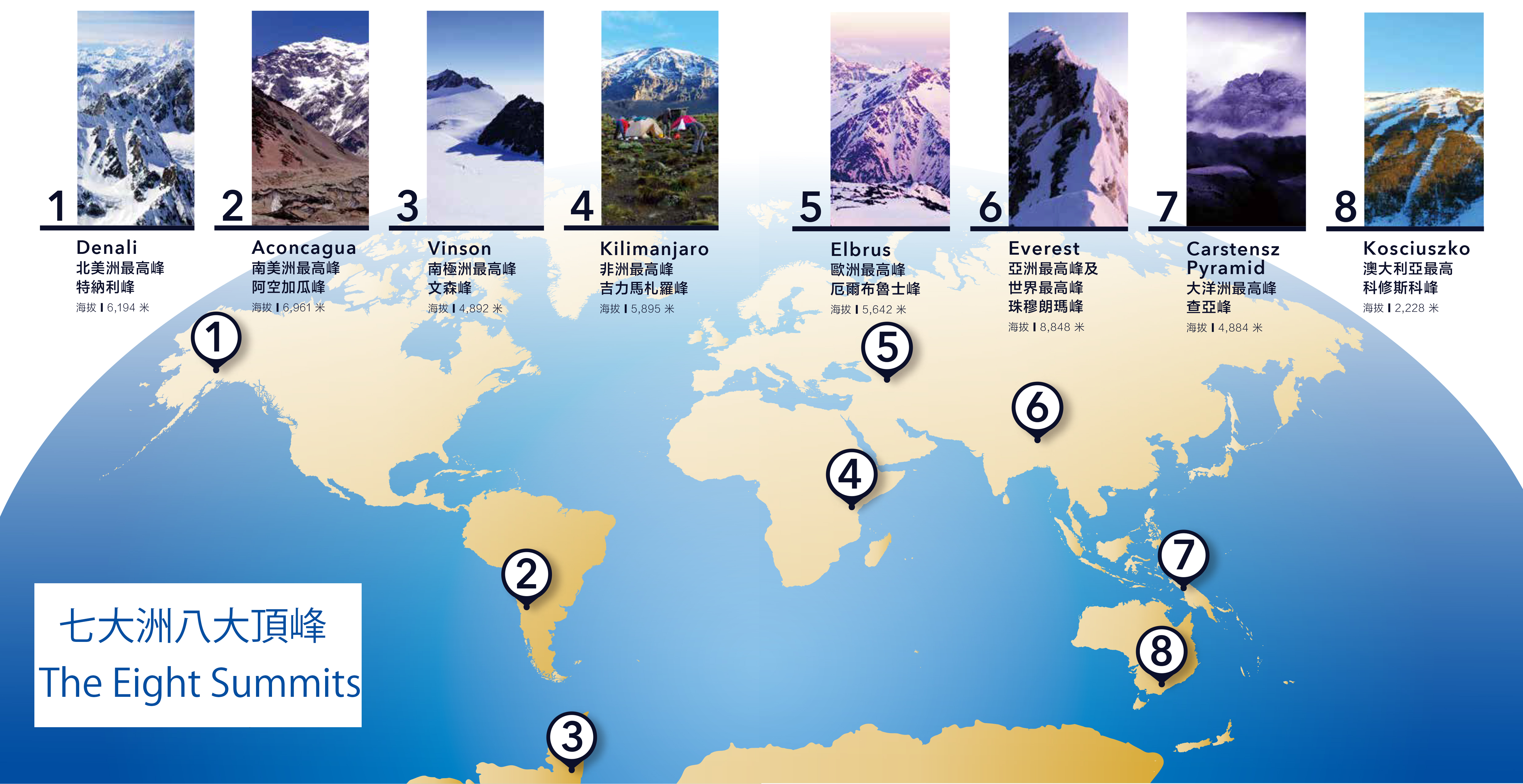
Location and altitude of the Eight Summits – eight highest mountain peaks on each of the seven continents (Australia has two entries).

The Eight Summits is the collective name for the eight highest mountain peaks on each of the seven continents (Australia has two entries). It is an alternative name for the "Seven Summits" due to different ways in naming the highest mountain on the continent of Australia.

Completing the Seven Summits—the highest peak on each continent—is recognized as a significant mountaineering objective. This milestone is often tracked in climbing databases and represents a notable goal for participants in the sport.

The Eight Summits consists of:

- Mount Everest (8,848.86 m or 29,032 ft), the highest mountain peak of Asia
- Aconcagua (6,962 m or 22,841 ft), the highest mountain peak of South America
- Denali (6,190.5 m or 20,310 ft), the highest mountain peak of North America
- Mount Kilimanjaro (5,893 m or 19,334 ft), the highest mountain peak of Africa
- Mount Elbrus (5,642 m or 18,510 ft), the highest mountain peak of Europe
- Vinson Massif (4,892 m or 16,050 ft), the highest mountain peak of Antarctica
- Puncak Jaya (4,884 m or 16,024 ft), the highest mountain peak of Indonesia, and the highest mountain peak of an island on Earth
- Mount Kosciuszko (2,228 m or 7,310 ft), the highest mountain peak of Mainland Australia

== Controversy ==
Due to the difference in definition and the controversy on the boundaries of continents, there were several proposed versions of the "Seven Summits".

The most prominent one includes "The Messner List" which omitted Mount Kosciuszko in Mainland Australia. Supporters of this list argue that Puncak Jaya in Indonesia should be regarded as the Summit for the Australian continent. This is also due to the fact that reaching the summit of Mount Kosciuszko involves a simple hike with no mountaineering requirements and is thus a considerably easier task than any of the other mountains. Another list is called "The Bass List", named after Richard Bass, the first mountaineer to complete his particular list of "Seven Summits" which omitted Puncak Jaya in Indonesia.

This results in the list for the "Eight Summits", including both Puncak Jaya (also named Carstensz Pyramid or abbreviated as CP) and Mount Kosciuszko (abbreviated as K). This list is also called "The Bass and Messner List".

== See also ==
- Eight-thousander
- Explorers Grand Slam, also known as the Adventurers Grand Slam
- Extremes on Earth
- List of highest mountains on Earth
- List of islands by highest point
- Lists of mountains (for other climbing lists)
- Seven Summits
- Three Poles Challenge
