= Montross =

Montross may refer to:

- Montross, Virginia, town in Westmoreland County, Virginia, United States

== People ==
- Montross Phansovannarun (born 2003), Cambodian swimmer
- Christine Montross (born 1973), American psychiatrist and writer
- Eric Montross (1971–2023), American basketball player
- Lynn Montross (1895–1961), American historian

== See also ==
- Montrose (disambiguation)
- Mont Ross, stratovolcano in the Kerguelen Islands
- Matross
