= Montrose station =

Montrose station may refer to:

- Montrose station (CTA Blue Line), a rapid transit station in Chicago, Illinois, United States
- Montrose station (CTA Brown Line), a rapid transit station in Chicago, Illinois, United States
- Montrose station (Houston), a light rail station in Houston, Texas, United States
- Montrose station (Metro-North), a former commuter rail station in Montrose, New York, United States
- Montrose railway station, in Montrose, Angus, Scotland
- Montrose railway station (Caledonian Railway), a former station in Montrose, Angus, Scotland

== See also ==
- Montrose Avenue station, on the BMT Canarsie Line of the New York Subway, United States
