= Barr Trail =

Hiking route in Colorado

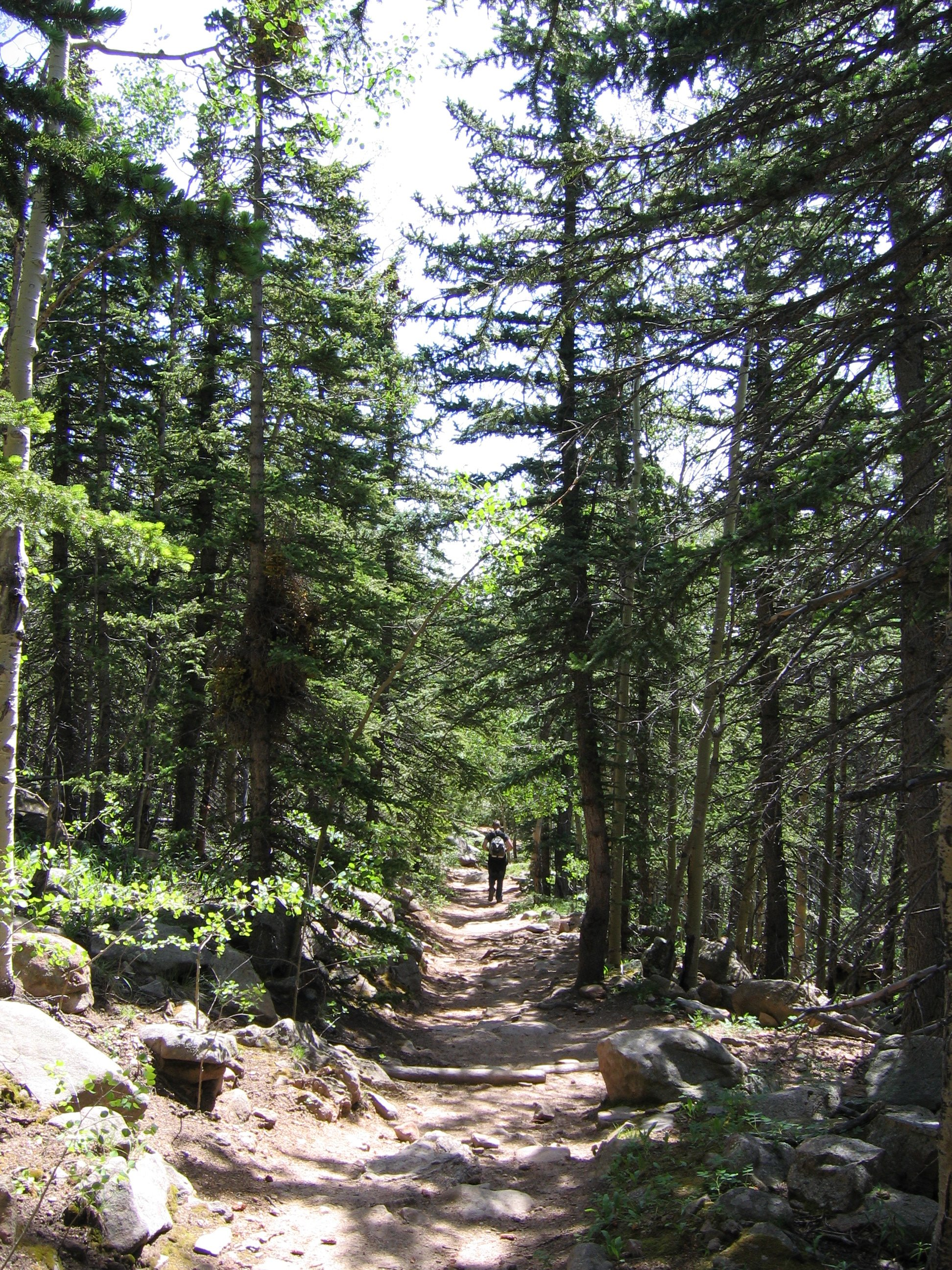
- Barr Trail, a couple miles below Barr Camp, downward view, July 2007
- Length: 13 miles (21 km)
- Location: Colorado, United States
- Established: 1918
- Trailheads: Manitou Springs, Colorado; 38.8557°N 104.9339°W; Pikes Peak summit 38.8400°N 105.0432°W
- Use: Hiking
- Elevation gain/loss: 7,390 feet (2,250 m) gain
- Highest point: 14,115 feet (4,302 m)
- Website: U.S. Forest Service: Barr Trail

Barr Trail is a 13-mile (21 km) trail in the Pike National Forest that begins in Manitou Springs, Colorado and ends at the Pikes Peak summit. The high-elevation trail with a long sustained grade is rated more difficult by the U.S. Forest Service. With a 7,800 feet (2,400 m) elevation gain to reach the summit, the Colorado Springs Convention & Visitors Bureau states it is an advanced trail and is the most difficult trail in the Pikes Peak region.

Barr Trail is used for the Pikes Peak Ascent, Pikes Peak Marathon, and the Barr Trail Mountain Race. The Ascent and Marathon start in Manitou Springs in front of City Hall and connect with the Barr Trail from upper Ruxton Avenue. Both races ascend to the Pikes Peak summit at 14,115'. The Marathon is an out-and-back race that finishes at Ruxton and Manitou avenues in Manitou Springs. The 12.6-mile course for the Barr Trail Mountain Race starts at the Cog Railway Depot and ascends to Barr Camp at 10,200', then reverses back down to the trailhead via Hydro Street.

== History ==
A trail was created by a prospector in the mid-1800s, but the trail did not allow for travel by burro from Mount Manitou to the summit of Pikes Peak. Beginning in 1914, Fred Barr built the burro trail, with a maximum 12% grade to the top of the peak for his burro train business. Aside from his work on the major portion of the trail, he supervised a crew of ten men for the U.S. Forest Service in 1917 who built the portion of the trail from the top of the Manitou Incline down to Manitou Springs. (Note: The History for Barr Camp states that Civilian Conservation Corps (CCC) workers completed the lower three miles from the trailhead to the top of Mount Manitou in the 1920s for the Forest Service.) He hiked the entire trail and made it to the top of Pikes Peak on Christmas Eve 1918.

Barr Camp was built by Barr between 1922 and 1924. It was used by Barr and his burro train customers for an overnight stay between Manitou Incline and the summit. Staffed by year-round caretakers, the camp continued to provide overnight accommodations for Barr Trail hikers.

In 1948, the U.S. Forest Service rebuilt the trail, following the original route. Burro trains were used to transport people along the trail until the 1960s.

The 13-mile trail was designated a National Recreation Trail in 1979. It is one of the most frequently used trails in Colorado.

== Trail ==
Points along the trail include:

Trail
Mile	Description	Elevation
0	Trailhead on Ruxton Avenue near the Manitou and Pike's Peak Railway depot, Manitou Springs	6,707 feet (2,044 m)
6.3 (Note: The Barr Camp site says that the camp is about 6.5 miles from the trailhead.)	Barr Camp, 2 acres (8,100 m^{2}) with picnic tables, restrooms cabin, bunkhouse, camping, and meals	10,186 feet (3,105 m)
9	Timberline A-frame shelter	12,098 feet (3,687 m)
13	Pikes Peak Summit	14,115 feet (4,302 m)

On average, it can take six to ten hours to reach the summit from the trailhead. Many people schedule their hikes or overnight stays so that they are on the summit by noon in the summer, with the return trip down the mountain shortly after to avoid the threat of lightning. (Note: In 2008, Backpacker magazine said that Barr Trail is one of the country's top 10 most dangerous hikes because of the danger of lightning strikes. They advise that hikers begin to descend from the summit by noon to get below the timberline before there is a threat of a lightning strike.) Other considerations are managing altitude, temperature, and weather changes. For instance, regardless of the season it may be 40 Fahrenheit degrees (≈ 22 °C) colder on the summit than at the trailhead.
