= Monterosa =

Monterosa may refer to:

- Monterosa (Warrenton, Virginia), a historic home located at Warrenton, Fauquier County, Virginia, USA
- Monterosa tomato, a hybrid tomato cultivar
- Monterosa Ski, an Italian ski resort
- 947 Monterosa, a minor planet orbiting the Sun

== See also ==
- Isotta Fraschini Tipo 8C Monterosa, a prototype Italian car of the 1940s manufactured by Isotta Fraschini
- Monte Rosa (disambiguation)
