= Montrose Township =

Montrose Township may refer to:

- Montrose Township, Ashley County, Arkansas, in Ashley County, Arkansas
- Montrose Township, Lee County, Iowa
- Montrose Charter Township, Michigan
- Montrose Township, Cavalier County, North Dakota, in Cavalier County, North Dakota
- Montrose Township, McCook County, South Dakota, in McCook County, South Dakota
