= Mount Rosa (Colorado) =

Mountain in United States of America

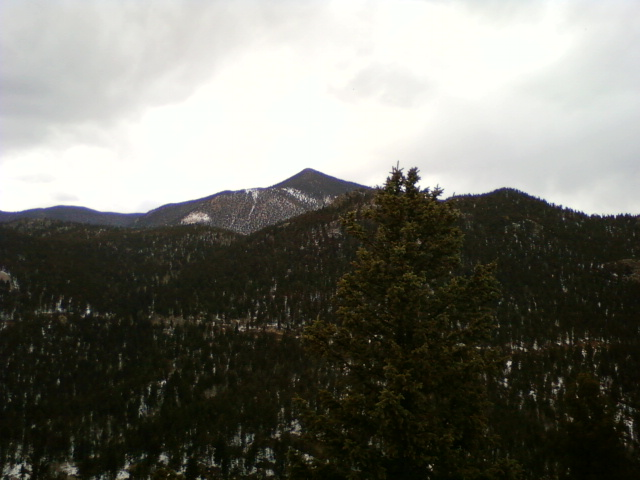
- Mount Rosa viewed from Sugarloaf Mountain to the southeast.

Highest point
- Elevation: 11,504 ft (3,506 m)
- Prominence: 499 ft (152 m)
- Isolation: 2.75 mi (4.43 km)
- Coordinates: 38°45′15″N 104°56′53″W

Geography
- Location within Colorado
- Location: Teller County, Colorado, U.S.
- Parent range: Front Range, Pikes Peak Massif
- Topo map(s): USGS 7.5' topographic map Manitou Springs, Colorado

Climbing
- Easiest route: hike

Mount Rosa is a mountain summit of the Pikes Peak Massif in the southern Front Range of the Rocky Mountains of North America. The 11,504-foot (3,506 m) peak is located in Pike National Forest, 12.8 miles (20.6 km) southwest by west (bearing 233°) of downtown Colorado Springs in Teller County, Colorado, United States.

== Mountain ==
Mount Rosa rises 5,475 ft (1,669 m) above downtown Colorado Springs and is among the taller summits on the city's skyline.

== Hiking ==
Hikers may access Mt. Rosa and its summit by way of several hiking trails in the area. The most common route is the Frosty Park Route, and may be accessed by taking Cheyenne Mountain Blvd. in the Broadmoor neighborhood, towards the west, then Old Stage Road and Gold Camp Road for 11.1 miles until Forest Road 379 is reached. FR 379 is a rough 4wd road and should only be driven using a vehicle that has both 4wd and high clearance, (there's one stream crossing near the beginning of the road which may have a substantial amount of water in it, depending on the season). Take FR 379 for about 1.5 miles until you reach a large clearing on the western flank on Mt. Rosa. Park here (38°45'36.71"N, 104°57'37.07"W), and begin your hike along the unnamed trail to the east until you reach trail 672. Follow trail 672 up the western flank of Mt. Rosa until it tops out on the windswept, north ridge. Take the trail that follows the ridge up and south to Mt. Rosa's summit, (if you continue, you'll head down the eastern flank of Mt. Rosa and into Buffalo Canyon). Follow this trail for about half a mile until you reach the summit of Mt. Rosa.

== See also ==
- List of Colorado mountain ranges
- List of Colorado mountain summits
  - List of Colorado fourteeners
  - List of Colorado 4000 meter prominent summits
  - List of the most prominent summits of Colorado
- List of Colorado county high points
