= SS Montrose =

A number of steamships were named Montrose, including -

- SS Montrose (1897), a Canadian ocean liner in service 1897–1914
- SS Montrose (1922), a Canadian ocean liner in service 1922–39
