= Manitou Incline =

Hiking trail rising above Manitou Springs, Colorado, United States

Coordinates: 38°51′25″N 104°55′55″W

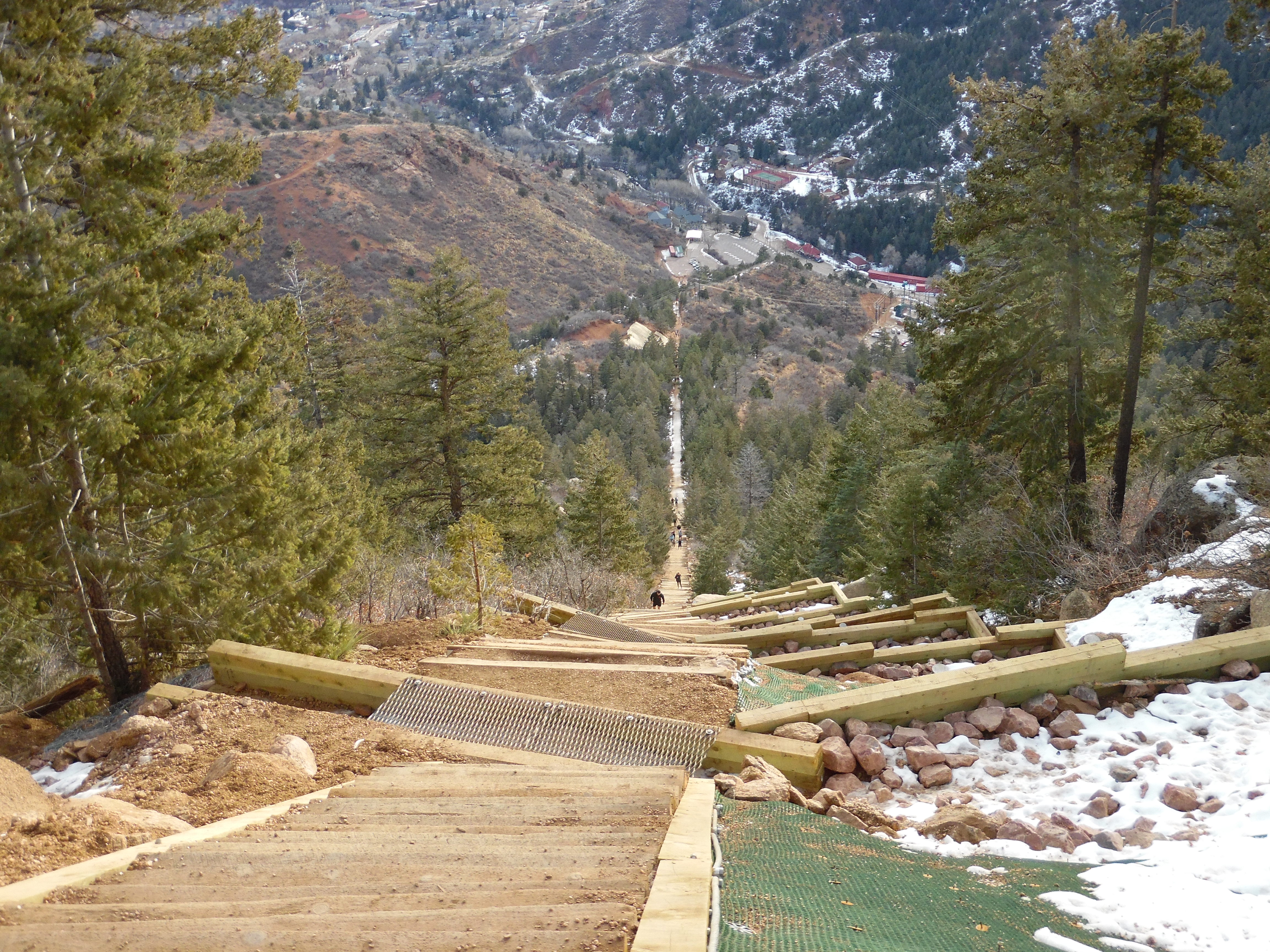
- View from the Barr Trail Bailout, approximately two-thirds up the incline
- Length: Approx. 0.88 miles (1.42 km)
- Location: Manitou Springs, Colorado, US
- Trailheads: Barr Trail
- Use: Hiking
- Highest point: Peak, 8,590 feet (2,620 m)
- Lowest point: Base, 6,500 feet (2,000 m)
- Difficulty: Extreme
- Season: Year round
- Sights: Pikes Peak

The Manitou Springs Incline, also known as the Manitou Incline or simply the Incline, is a popular hiking trail rising above Manitou Springs, Colorado, near Colorado Springs. The Incline ascends Mount Manitou on the east slope of Rocky Mountain which is itself on the eastern flank of Pikes Peak. The trail is the remains of a former 3 ft (914 mm) narrow gauge funicular railway whose tracks washed out during a rock slide in 1990. The Incline is famous for its sweeping views and steep grade, with an average grade of 45% (24°) and as steep as 68% (34°) in places, making it a fitness challenge for locals of the Colorado Springs area. The incline gains 2,011 feet (613 m) of elevation in 0.88 miles (1.42 km) horizontal. Currently the Incline has approximately 2,768 steps from the bottom to the summit, although the top step is numbered "2768". The number of steps changes occasionally with trail maintenance and deterioration. As of September 2025 there are 2,744 steps as noted in the Netflix series Countdown: Canelo vs Crawford.

Free reservations are still currently required to hike the Manitou Incline which can be made at the Manitou Incline page on the City of Colorado Springs website.

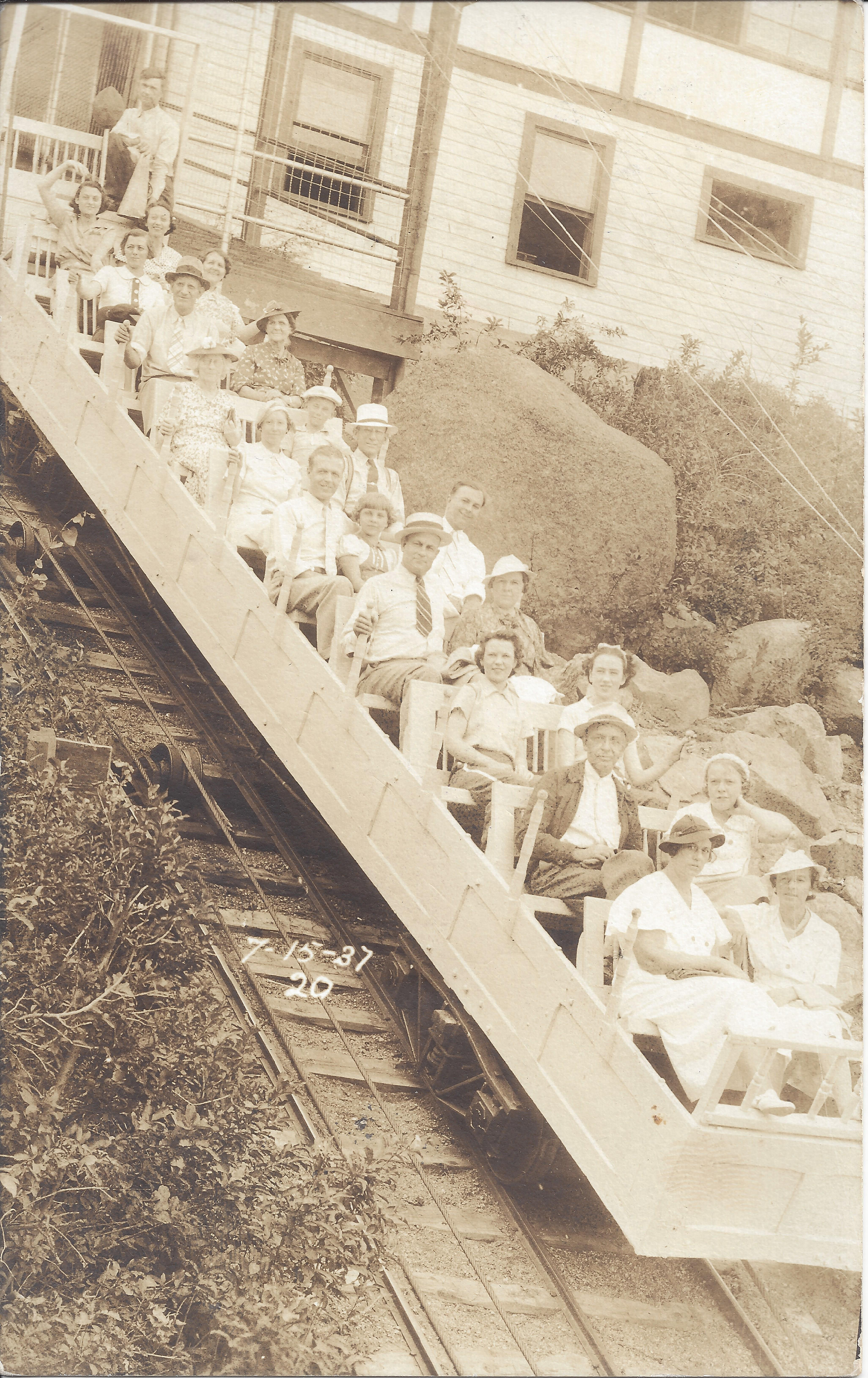
Incline boxcar in 1937

== History ==
Incline in its early days

The Incline was constructed up the slope of Mount Manitou under the ownership of Dr. Newton N. Brumback as a funicular in 1907, for the purpose of providing access to water tanks at the top of the mountain that would provide gravity-fed water pressure to the cities of Manitou Springs and Colorado Springs. Originally, the railroad was constructed to access a hydroelectric plant and service the water pipes. Shortly after its construction, the Manitou and Pike's Peak Railway was opened as a tourist attraction.

The Incline's original summit house was a rudimentary building constructed from left-over materials from the Incline's construction. It burned down in 1914. The summit house was quickly rebuilt into a more elaborate, comfortable, and safer structure, offering shelter from storms and the elements. The 1914 structure remained until 1958 when it was replaced by an updated summit house, which remained until it was dismantled after the Incline's closure. The Incline operated under the Pikes Peak Cog Railway until a rock slide in 1990 washed out the rail bed and the Cog Railway decided to not repair the tracks.

During the COVID-19 pandemic, the Manitou Springs City Council, under emergency declaration, voted to close the Incline on March 17, 2020. The closure was a result of health concerns over a lack of social distancing and other health measures, as well as a way to mitigate the number of incidents on the Incline that the fire department would have to address. Manitou Springs stated in a press release on March 18, 2020, "the first responders who address emergencies on the Incline are put into a high risk situation." The Mayor of Manitou Springs, John Graham, stated: "While we were reluctant to close the Incline, we had far more grave reservations regarding public health." On August 4, 2020, the Manitou Springs City Council approved a memorandum of understanding (MOU) between Colorado Springs and Manitou Springs to reopen the Incline. Within this MOU was protocol for a free online reservation system that managed the number of users, with all reservations being handled by the City of Colorado Springs.

== Legal battles ==
Though the Incline is a popular hike and fitness destination for locals, its existence since its public closing in 1990 has been controversial. Many locals and some Forest Service officials wanted to keep it closed to allow it to revegetate, either by reseeding or allowing nature to reclaim the scar.

Another controversy centered on parking rights at the base of the trail head, which is co-located with the Barr Trail trailhead and the Pikes Peak Cog Railway. All three sit in the narrow Englemann Canyon, and the popularity of the Incline has caused major parking conflicts with these entities.

The land through which the Incline passes on its ascent is owned by three entities: the bottom portion is owned by Colorado Springs Utilities, the middle section is owned by the city of Colorado Springs, and the top portion is owned by the US Forest Service. The 2016 land swap, known as the Broadmoor Land Exchange, between Colorado Springs and the Broadmoor Hotel, traded 14 sections of land totalling 371 acres for 189.5 acres of Colorado Springs land. The part of the Incline that was owned by the Cog Railway was included in this land swap, making all of the Incline now publicly owned land. The land swap was approved but was challenged unsuccessfully in court by a citizens group.

One obstacle to the conversion of the Incline to a public hiking trail, its status as a railway right-of-way, was resolved in January 2013, after it was formally abandoned by the United States Congress.

== Hiking trail and fitness challenge ==
Since its closure as a railway in 1990, the trail has steadily grown in popularity as a hiking trail and fitness challenge. The base of the Incline sits at 6,600 feet (2,000 m) and the trail climbs 2,011 feet (613 m) in about 0.88 miles (1.42 km). Hiking the trail should not be undertaken by the physically unfit, as there is no vehicle access to the trail and anyone injured or suffering a medical emergency will have to walk or be carried down by other hikers. At the top of the Incline, there is a tie-in to the Barr Trail that allows for hikers to descend without going back down the Incline. (This descent is approximately 2.79 miles or 4.49 kilometers, with a much gentler slope.) Due to the close proximity to the large and active population center of Colorado Springs, the large military population of nearby Army and Air Force bases, and the US Olympic Training Center, the Incline has become a popular fitness destination for those seeking an intense workout.

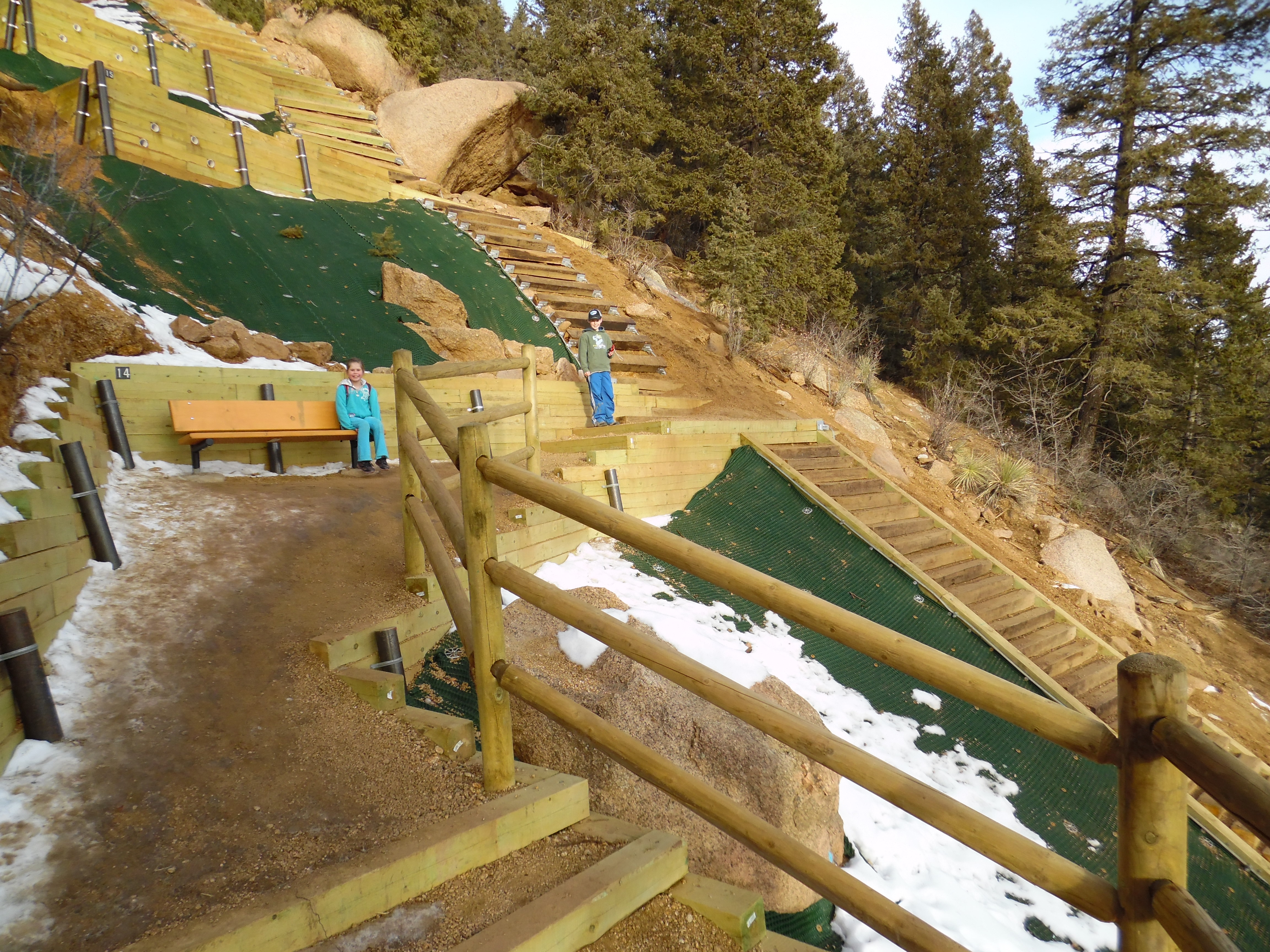
The Barr Trail Bailout, two-thirds of the way up the Incline

About 2/3 of the way up, a Barr Trail switchback passes just a few yards from the Incline, and there is a pathway that allows those who wish to exit the Incline the opportunity to take the Barr Trail back down as a 'bailout'. In 2020 two new bailouts were added that exit to the right (north) and lead to the Ute Pass trail. The first, the Lower Ute connector, is at step #395 and the second, the Upper Ute connector, is at step #1300 which is about 500 steps below the Barr trail bailout. These two new bailouts give hikers the option to exit a very difficult trail and also serve the purpose of alleviating some of the heavy traffic on the lower Barr Trail. The Incline is at its steepest grade just after the Barr Trail bailout for about another 200 feet (61 m), when it reaches the 'false summit', a semi-crest in the trail that obscures the true summit to hikers due to its extreme grade. Those who reach the false summit are about 3/4 of the way to the top, but still have several hundred feet to climb.

== Records ==
The verifiable satellite-tracked record of 17:16 was set September 12, 2023 by Swiss mountain runner Rémi Bonnet, breaking his own record of 17:25 from a year earlier. Also notable are the times of US mountain running team member Joseph Gray (17:45) and twelve-time champion of the Pikes Peak Marathon Matt Carpenter (18:31). The female Incline record is attributed to Allie McLaughlin of Colorado Springs (20:07).

In 2012, local resident Ed Baxter, 58, became the first person to complete the "Inclinathon", 13 consecutive trips up and down the Incline in one day. Baxter completed the effort in just over 13 hours. In 2012, Brandon Stapanowich broke the speed record for an Inclinathon at 11 hours 46 minutes. In 2014, Stapanowich also completed the first ever Ultra-Inclinathon, completing 22 laps of the Incline in 24 hours, the most ever completed in a day. He gained 44,000 feet (13,000 m) of altitude in this endeavor. Andrea Sansone holds the women's record for most ascents in a day, with 19 on May 31, 2022. On May 16, 2015, Wade Gardner broke the speed record for the Inclinathon with a time of 10 hours, 34 mins.

In 2011, Greg Cummings (a local resident with Type-I Diabetes) became the first person to hike the Incline more than 500 times in one year. Cummings hiked the Incline 601 times and ascended Pikes Peak 34 times, setting the World Record for elevation climbed in one year at just under 1.4 million vertical feet (430,000 meters). In 2013, Roger Austin ascended the Incline 719 times and reset the World Record to roughly 1.45 million vertical feet (440,000 meters) hiked/climbed in one year. In 2014, Greg Cummings ascended the Incline 1,400 times in 330 consecutive days, before the Incline closed for repairs. Along with other ascents, Cummings reset the World Record to 2.9 million vertical feet (880,000 meters) climbed in a year. In 2015, Roger Austin ascended the Incline 1,719 times and again reset the World Record to 3.4 million vertical feet (1,000,000 meters). Along the way, Austin set the record for most Inclinathons in one year at 26. On January 11, 2020, at the age of 62, Greg Cummings retook the one year Incline ascent record by completing 1,825 ascents in the previous 365 days and reset the World Record to 3.6 million vertical feet (1,100,000 meters) climbed in one year.

In 2022, Rachel Jones of Colorado became the first woman to climb the Incline 1,000 times in a year.

Chasidey Geissler of Woodland Park, Colorado became the fifth person to record and be verified for 1,000 laps within 365 days. On February 5, 2023, Chasidey broke the female world record with 1,004 laps in 311 days. She finished her 365-day year on March 31, 2023, with 1,222.

== Images ==
Incline boxcar 1908

View of the Incline from the Red Mountain Trail

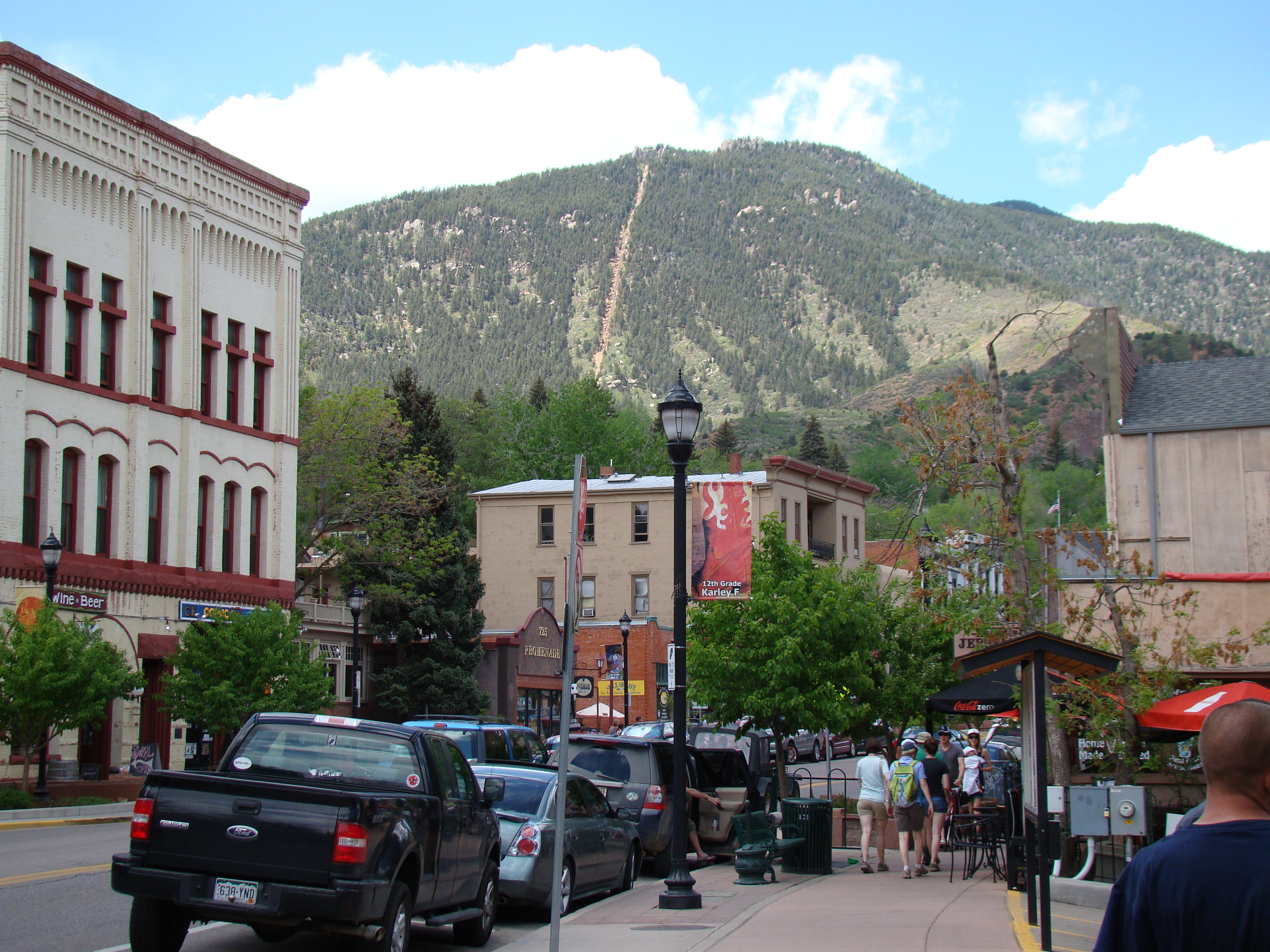
The Incline rising above Manitou Springs

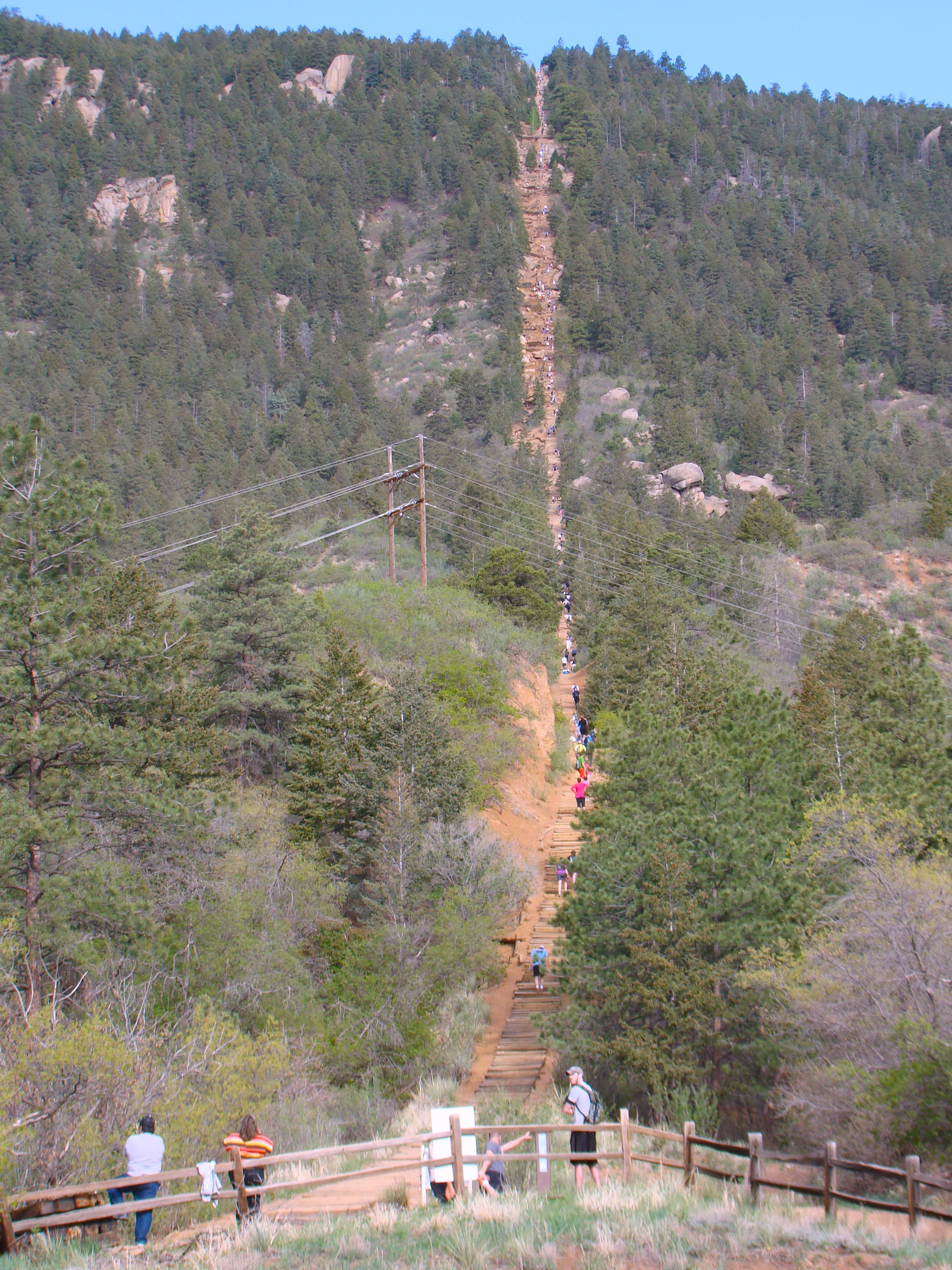
View of the Manitou Incline from the base, May 2013

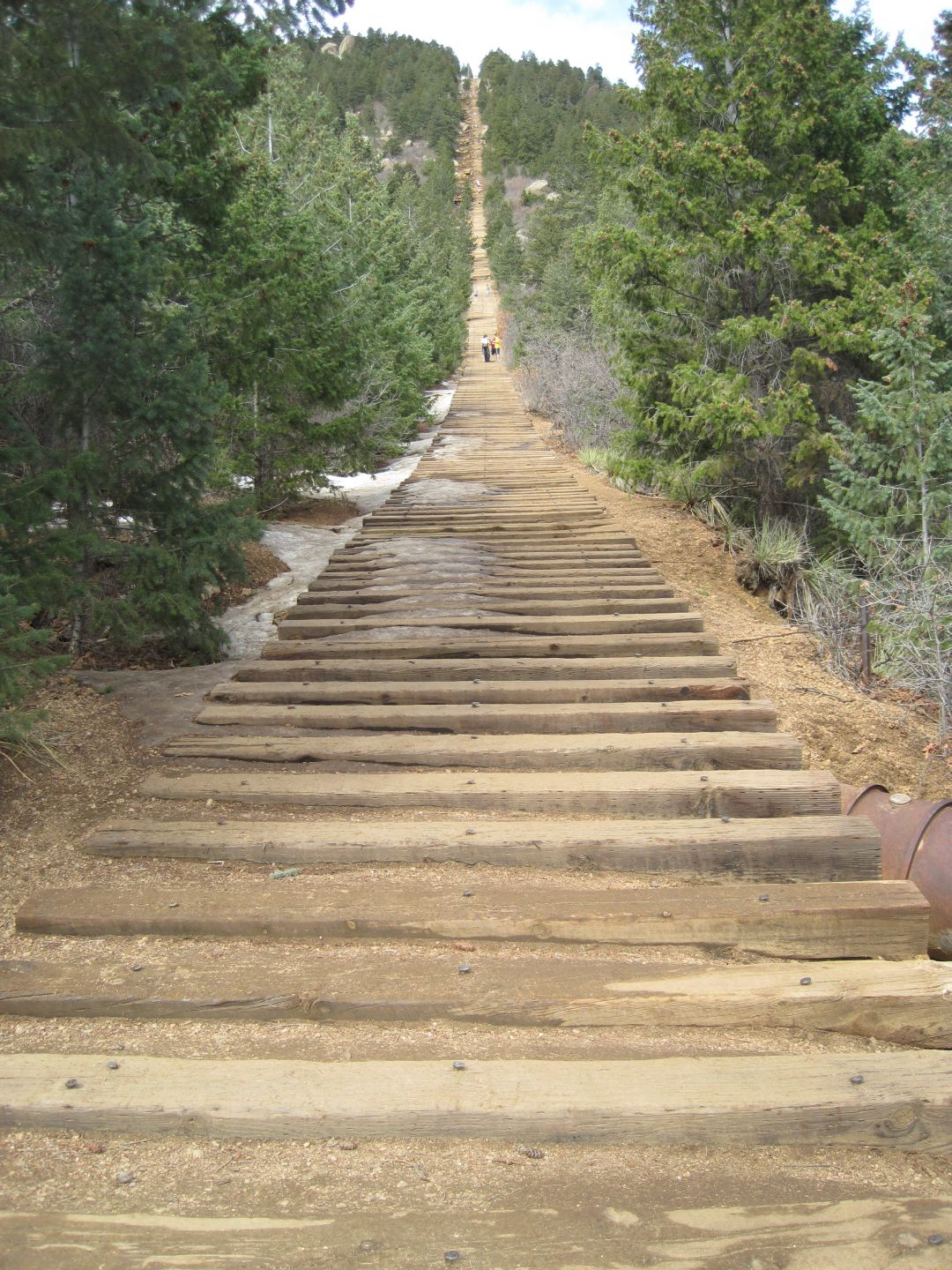
The Incline viewed from about 1/4 up from the trail head

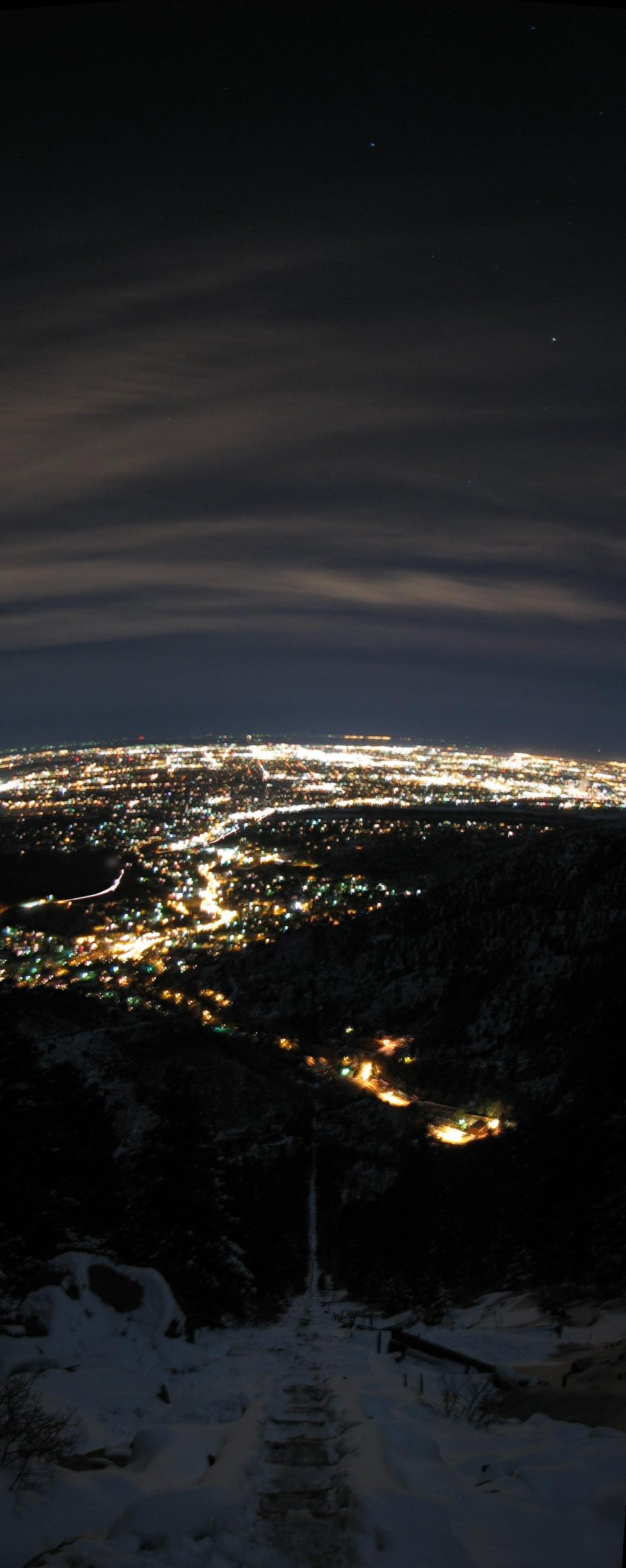
Nighttime panorama of Colorado Springs as viewed from the Incline.
