= Pikes Peak =

Mountain in Colorado, United States

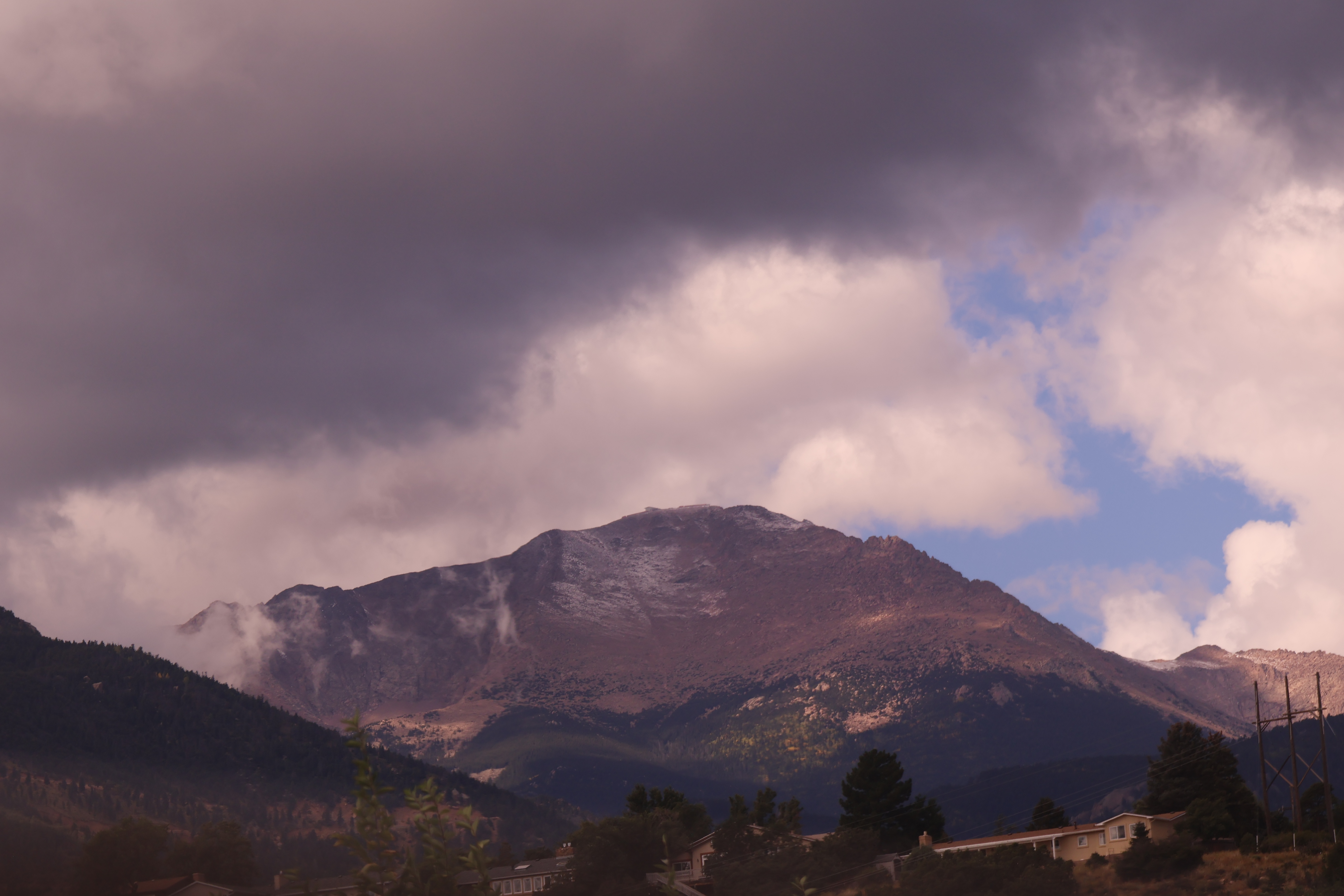
- Pikes Peak, 23 September 2025

Highest point
- Elevation: 14,107 feet (4,299.83 m); NAPGD2022
- Prominence: 5,530 feet (1,690 m)
- Isolation: 60.6 mi (97.6 km)
- Listing: North America highest peaks 53rd; US highest major peaks 39th; US most prominent peaks 89th; US most isolated peaks 115th; Colorado highest major peaks 20th; Colorado fourteeners 30th; Colorado county high points 17th
- Coordinates: 38.8405°N 105.0442°W

Naming
- Etymology: Zebulon Pike
- Native name: Heey-otoyoo' (Arapaho); Tavakiev (Ute-Southern Paiute)

Geography
- Location within Colorado Location within the United States
- Location: High point of El Paso County, Colorado, United States
- Parent range: Front Range, Highest summit of the Pikes Peak Massif
- Topo map(s): USGS 7.5' topographic map Pikes Peak, Colorado

Geology
- Rock age: ~1.05 Gyr
- Mountain type: Granite

Climbing
- First ascent: 1820 by Edwin James and party
- Easiest route: East Slopes (Barr Trail): Hike, class 1

Pikes Peak or America's Mountain is an ultra-prominent fourteener of the Front Range of the Rocky Mountains of North America. Pikes Peak's summit, with an elevation of 14,115 ft (4,302 m) above sea level, is the easternmost fourteener in the United States. Pikes Peak is in Pike National Forest, Colorado, with the base located in the town of Manitou Springs, 10 miles (16 km) west of downtown Colorado Springs, Colorado, in El Paso County, United States.

Zebulon Pike, a commissioned officer serving for the United States Army, received an order in 1806 by Thomas Jefferson to explore the Louisiana Purchase. Later that winter he attempted to climb the mountain, but the climb was abandoned, possibly due to the mountain's cold weather. The first successful documented hike was by the geologist and botanist Edwin James during his expedition on July 15, 1820. During the Pikes Peak gold rush, the mountain was named in honor of Zebulon Pike in several newspapers, creating widespread popularity.

The song "America the Beautiful" (originally called "America") has been associated with Pikes Peak for about a century. In 1893, the visiting professor and poet Katharine Lee Bates taught a summer course in western Colorado. Bates, who had been suffering from depression, was inspired to write "America the Beautiful", initially titled "Pikes Peak", soon after scaling to the summit in 1893.

== Description ==
The band of Ute people who called the Pikes Peak region their home were the Tabeguache, whose name means the "People of Sun Mountain". Tava or "sun", is the Ute word that was given by these first people to the mountain that is now called Pikes Peak. (In contrast, the name Tabeguache Peak is now used for a peak further west.) It is thought that the Ute people first arrived in Colorado about 500 A.D., however their oral history states that they were created on Tava. In the 1800s, when the Arapaho people arrived in Colorado, they knew the mountain as Heey-otoyoo' meaning "Long Mountain". By comparison, the Pawnee called the same mountain Tûs Pêh ("Where the Heavens Touch the Earth"), and the Ute Indians called it Tava-Kaavi ("Sun Mountain").

Throughout its history, European peoples have called the mountain El Capitán, Grand Peak, Great Peak, James Peak, Long Mountain, and Pike's Peak.

Early Spanish explorers named the mountain "El Capitán," meaning "The Leader". American explorer Zebulon Pike named the mountain "Highest Peak" in 1806, and the mountain was later commonly known as "Pike's Highest Peak." American explorer Stephen Harriman Long named the mountain "James Peak" in honor of Edwin James who climbed to the summit during Long's Expedition of 1820. The mountain was later renamed "Pike's Peak" in honor of Pike. The name was simplified to "Pikes Peak" by the United States Board on Geographic Names in 1890.

== Geography and geology ==
Pikes Peak is one of Colorado's 54 fourteeners, mountains more than 14,000 feet (4,267.2 m) above sea level. The massif rises over 8,000 ft (2,400 m) above downtown Colorado Springs. Pikes Peak is a designated National Historic Landmark. It is composed of a characteristic pink granite called Pikes Peak granite. The color is due to a large amount of potassium feldspar.

It is thought that the granite was once magma that crystallized at least 20 miles (32 km) beneath the Earth's surface, formed by an igneous intrusion during the Precambrian, approximately 1.05 billion years ago, during the Grenville orogeny. Through the process of uplifting, the hardened rock pushed through the Earth's crust and created a dome-like mountain, covered with less resistant rock. Years of erosion and weathering removed the soil and rock leaving the exposed mountain.

Soils on Pikes Peak above the timberline (approximately 12,000 ft or 3,700 m) are classified as cirque land. Forests at lower altitudes mostly lie over the brown stony, sandy, loams of the Catamount loam or Ivywild loam series.

=== Devils Playground ===
The Devils Playground is a minor sub peak of Pikes Peak located on the northwest side of the mountain near the Pikes Peak Highway. The Devil's Playground is named for the way lightning sometimes dances around the prominence during lightning storms. The Devils Playground is the highest point in Teller County at an approximate elevation of 13,075 feet (3,985 m).

== Recorded discovery ==
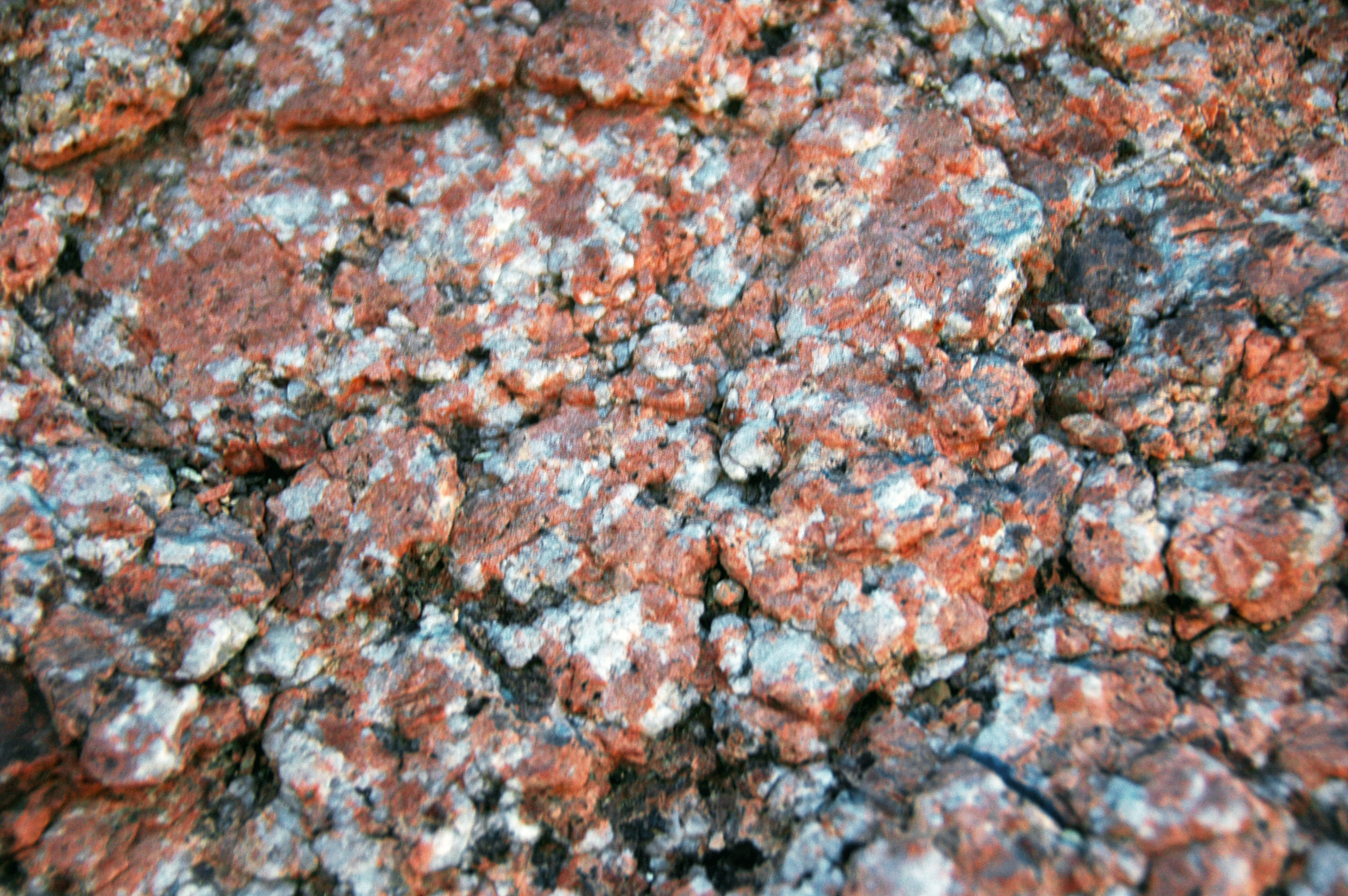
Pikes Peak Granite (Mesoproterozoic, 1.08 Ga; Ute Trail, Manitou Springs, Colorado, USA)

The first Europeans to see Pikes Peak were the Spanish in the 1700s. The first American sighting is often credited to members of the Pike Expedition, led by Zebulon Pike. After a failed attempt to climb to the top in November 1806, Pike wrote in his journal:

...here we found the snow middle deep; no sign of beast or bird inhabiting this region. The thermometer which stood at 9° above 0 at the foot of the mountain, here fell to 4° below 0. The summit of the Grand Peak, which was entirely bare of vegetation and covered with snow, now appeared at the distance of 15 or 16 miles [24 or 26 km] from us, and as high again as what we had ascended, and would have taken a whole day's march to have arrived at its base when I believed no human being could have ascended to its pinnacle. This with the condition of my soldiers who had only light overalls on, and no stockings, and every way ill provided to endure the inclemency of the region; the bad prospect of killing anything to subsist on, with the further detention of two or three days, which it must occasion, determined us to return.

== History ==
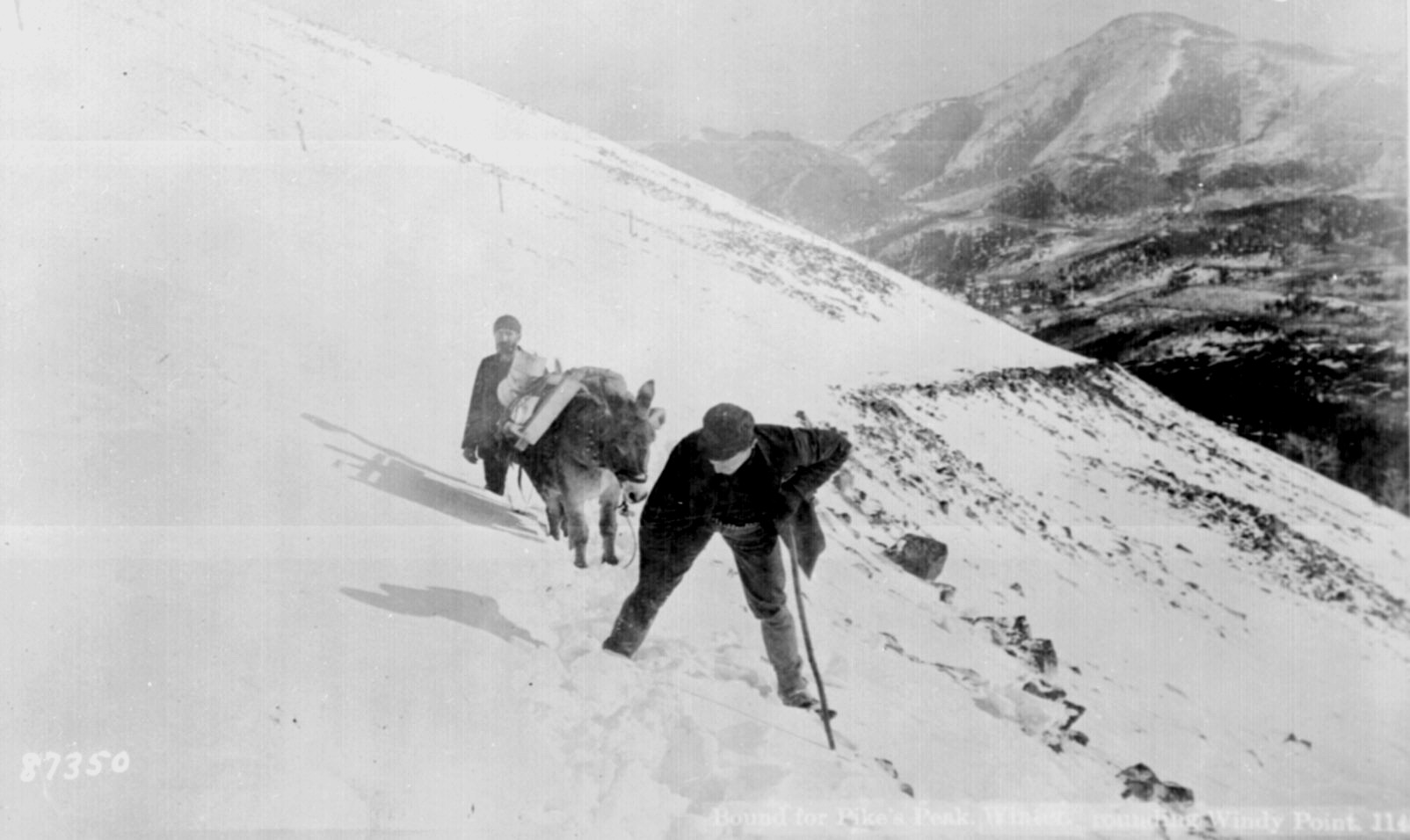
An 1890 winter climb (near Windy Point) up Pikes Peak

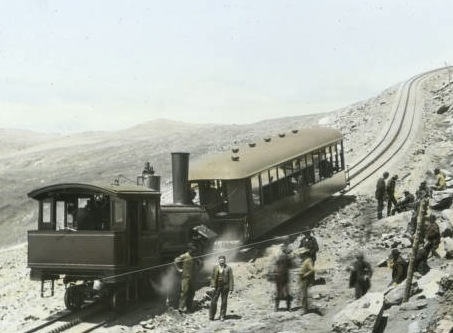
Manitou and Pike's Peak Railway train rounding Windy Point, around 1900.

The first European ascent of the peak came 14 years after Pike's discovery, in the summer of 1820. Edwin James, a young student who had just graduated from Middlebury College in Vermont, signed on as the relief botanist for Stephen Harriman Long's expedition after the first botanist had died. The expedition explored the South Platte River up as far as present-day Denver, then turned south and passed close to what James called "Pike's highest peak". James and two other men left the expedition, camped on the plains, and climbed the peak in two days, encountering little difficulty. Along the way, James was the first to describe the blue columbine, Colorado's state flower.

Gold was discovered in the area of present-day Denver in 1858, and newspapers referred to the gold-mining area as "Pike's Peak". Pike's Peak or Bust became the slogan of the Colorado gold rush (see also Fifty-Niner). This was more due to Pikes Peak's visibility to gold seekers traveling west across the plains than any actual significant gold find anywhere near Pikes Peak. Major gold deposits were not discovered in the Pikes Peak area until the Cripple Creek Mining District was discovered southwest of Pikes Peak and led, in 1893, to one of the last major gold rushes in the lower 48 states.

In July 1860, Clark, Gruber and Company commenced minting gold coins in Denver bearing the phrase "Pike's Peak Gold" and an artist's rendering of the peak (sight unseen) on the obverse. In 1863, the U.S. Treasury purchased the minting equipment for $25,000 (or $650,000 adjusted for inflation) to open the Denver Mint.

Julia Archibald Holmes and James Holmes traveled to the Rocky Mountains in Colorado in 1858, and reached the summit on August 5, with J. D. Miller and George Peck, making Archibald Holmes the first European-American woman to climb Pikes Peak. From the summit, she wrote in a letter to her mother: "Nearly everyone tried to discourage me from attempting it, but I believed that I should succeed; and now here I am, and I feel that I would not have missed this glorious sight for anything at all."

The summit of Pikes Peak in 1901

Thirty-five years later, in July 1893, Katharine Lee Bates wrote the song "America the Beautiful", after having admired the view from the top of Pikes Peak. It appeared in print in The Congregationalist, a weekly journal, on July 4, 1895. A plaque commemorating the words to the song was placed at the summit.

On July 17, 1913 William Wayne Brown drove his car, the Bear Cat, 20 miles (32 km) to the summit. The ascent took 5 hours and 28 minutes.

The uppermost portion of Pikes Peak, above 14,000 feet (4,267 m) elevation, was declared a National Historic Landmark in 1961.

Pikes Peak was the home of a ski resort from 1939 until 1984.

== Today ==
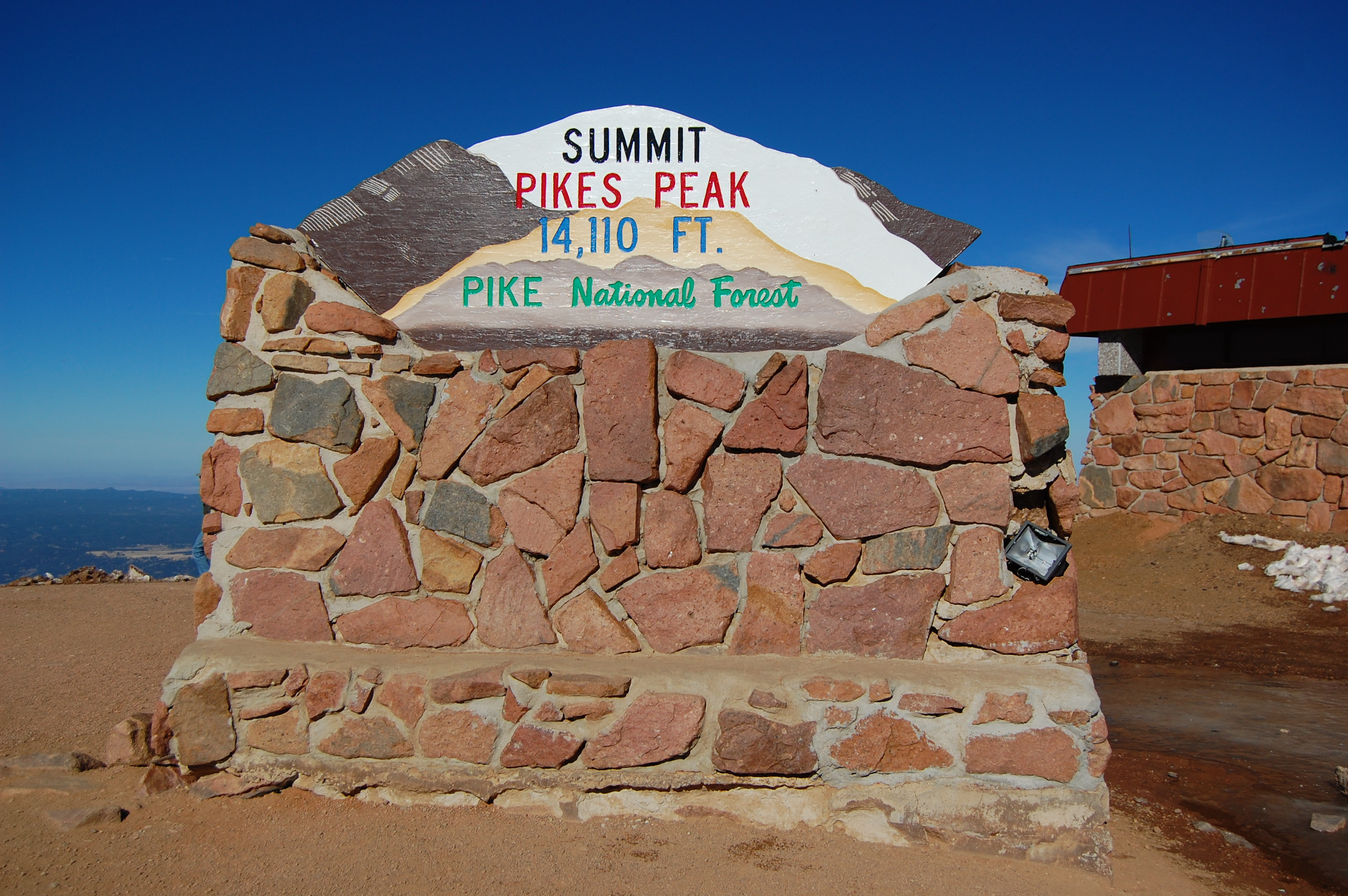
The sign at the summit

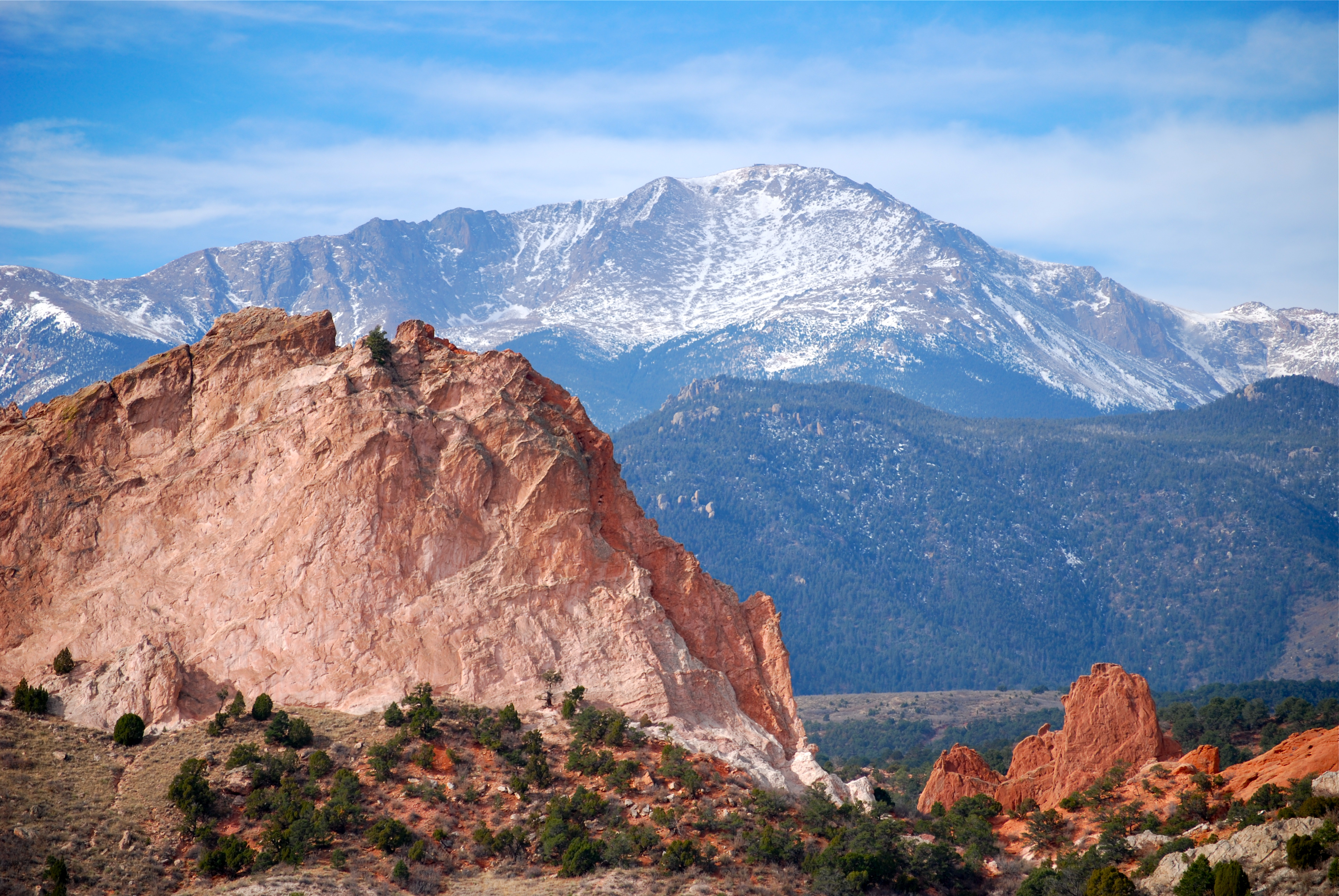
Pikes Peak dominates the backdrop of Garden of the Gods.

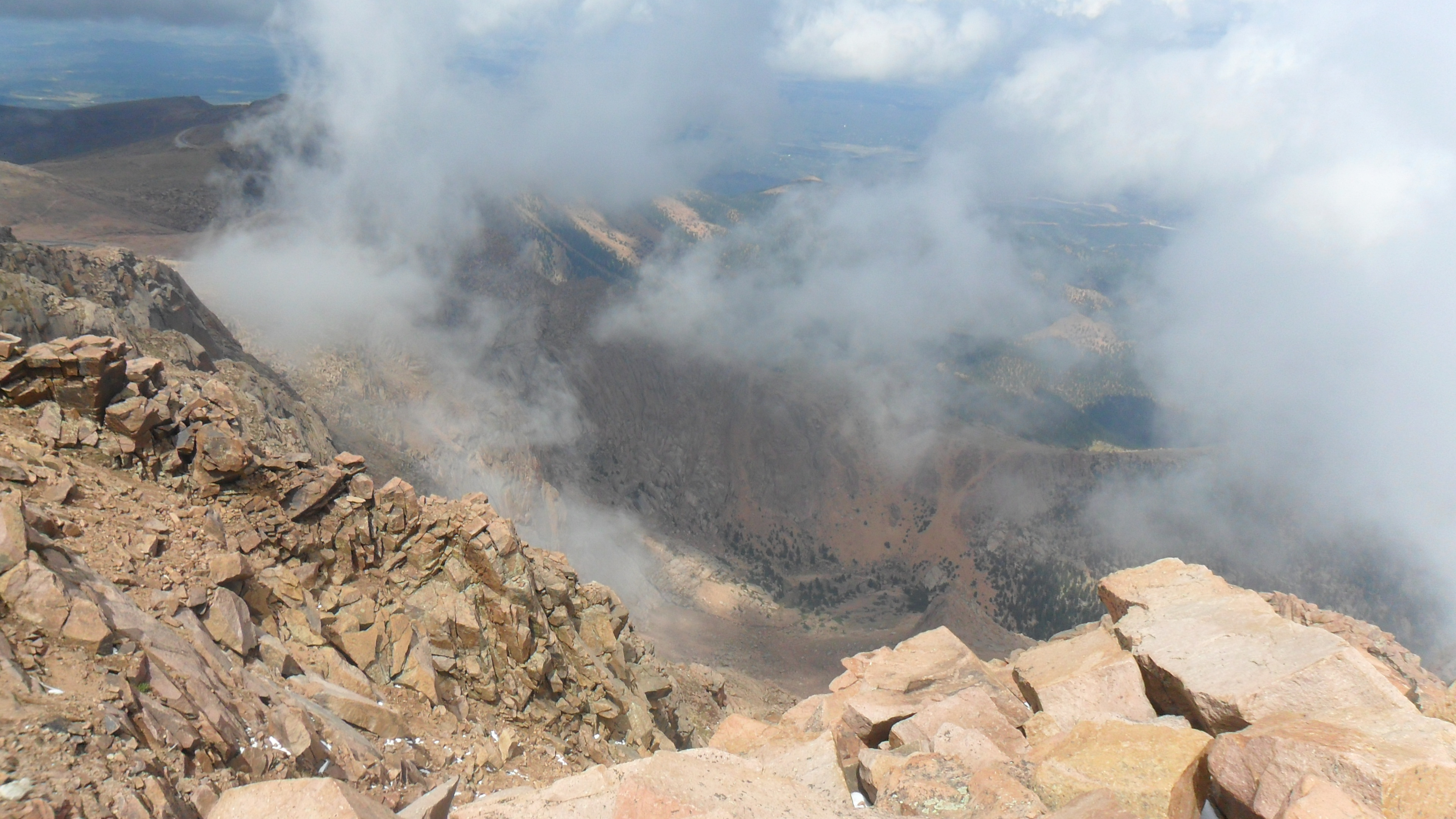
View from Pikes Peak summit looking north

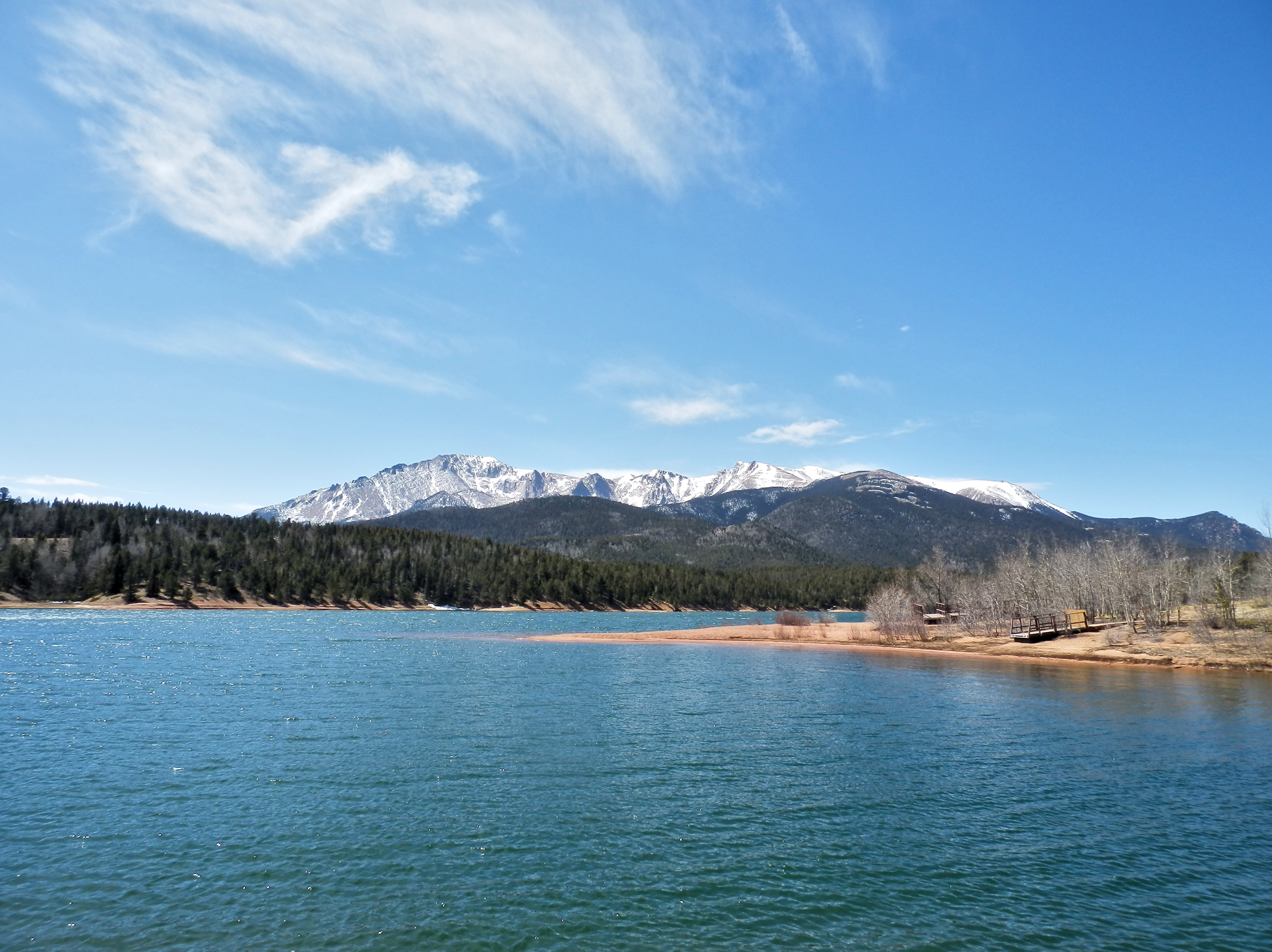
View of Pikes Peak from the Crystal Creek Reservoir

There are several visitor centers on Pikes Peak, some with a gift shop and restaurant. These centers are located at the 6-mile (9.7 km) and 12-mile (19 km) markers of the toll road, plus one at the summit itself. Along with other food, the Summit House sells special high altitude doughnuts, frying up to 700 per hour. The doughnuts collapse or go mushy if transported to lower altitudes.

There are several ways to ascend the mountain. The Manitou and Pike's Peak Railway, the world's highest cog railroad, operated from Manitou Springs to the summit, closed for repairs in 2017. After being closed for more than three years, the cog railway resumed service seven days per week (conditions permitting) on May 27, 2021.

Road vehicles can be driven to the summit via the Pikes Peak Highway, a 19 mi (31 km) road that starts a few miles up Ute Pass at Cascade. The road has a series of switchbacks, treacherous at high speed, called "The W's" for their shape on the northwest side of the mountain. The road is maintained by the city of Colorado Springs as a toll road. A project to pave the remainder of the road was completed on October 1, 2011. The project was in response to a suit by the Sierra Club over damage caused by the gravel and sediment that is constantly washed off the road into the alpine environment. In 2023, the toll road cost US$15 for age 16 and older or US$5 for age 6 to 15; from December 1 to April 30 the cost is reduced to US$10 for age 16 and older.

The Highway is famous worldwide for the annual Pikes Peak International Hill Climb, a motor race held since 1916. The short film Climb Dance features Ari Vatanen racing his Peugeot 405 T16 up the steep, twisty slopes. It also hosts the Pikes Peak Cycling Hill Climb (formerly Assault on the Peak), a cycling hillclimb race first held in 2010, and the USA Cycling Hill Climb National Championships, a race first held in 2016.

The most popular hiking route to the top is called Barr Trail, which approaches the summit from the east. The trailhead is just past the cog railway depot in Manitou Springs. Visitors can walk, hike, or bike the trail. Although the Barr Trail is rated only Class 1, it is a long and arduous hike with nearly 8,000 ft (2,400 m) of elevation gain, and a 13 mi (21 km) trip one-way. The Pikes Peak Marathon, a trail race held since 1956, is a round trip between the trailhead and the Pikes Peak. The Barr Trail Mountain Race is a 13 miles (21 km) round trip between the trailhead and Barr Camp. Another route, rated as Class 2, begins at Crags Campground, approaching the summit from the west.

Barr Trail can also be accessed via the Manitou Incline.

Since the end of 1922, The AdAmAn Club, a mountaineering group, climb the Barr Trail on the east face of Pikes Peak each year on December 30th, stay overnight at Barr Camp, and continue to the top on December 31. Then, at midnight on New Year's Eve, the AdAmAn members and their guests ignite a fireworks display from the summit.

Since 1969, the summit of Pikes Peak has been the site of the United States Army Pikes Peak Research Laboratory, a medical research laboratory for the assessment of the impact of high altitude on human physiological and medical parameters of military interest.

On June 4, 2018, ground-breaking was held for a new 38,000 square feet (3,500 m^{2}) Summit Complex which is being constructed next to the current Summit House. The older facility will remain open to the more than 600,000 visitors annually through the end of construction in the fall of 2020 or summer of 2021. Around 40 contractors are working on the $50 million project. The general contractor, G.E. Johnson Construction Co., estimates that about half of the budget is for materials, many of which are prefabricated in downslope shops, and the balance is for labor, because of the project's high standards and the rigors of working for a maximum of 6 1/2 hours per day at such a high altitude during a short season of April to October. Heavy equipment and prefabricated building components are slowly moved up the mountain's highway in the middle of the night to avoid any car traffic. Ground conditions are bedrock and alpine permafrost, soil and rock that remains at or below freezing temperatures all year to depths of up to 200 feet (61 m), only warming above freezing in direct sunlight or due to external sources. Problems with excavation and blasting exist because the permafrost in the fractured granite actually absorbs energy. The project is being constructed to achieve both Leadership in Energy and Environmental Design (LEED) Platinum Certification and Living Building Challenge. The new complex will include a visitor center, a communications facility for Colorado Springs Utilities, and the Army's High-Altitude Research Laboratory.

On July 20, 2023, an EF1 tornado touched down on the mountain, snapping and uprooting several trees. The tornado travelled 2 miles (3.2 km) along Pikes Peak Highway and wind speeds reached 108 miles per hour (174 km/h). No injuries were reported from the storm.

== Climate ==
At the peak, the partial pressure of oxygen is only about 60% of that at sea level. Water boils at 186 °F (86 °C) at 14,000 feet, rather than 212 °F (100 °C) at sea level.

A faster rate of respiration is required by humans and animals not acclimated to high altitudes. Altitude sickness may develop in those who are sensitive or who over-exert themselves.

The summit of Pikes Peak has a polar climate (ET) due to its elevation. Snow is a possibility any time year-round, and thunderstorms with high winds gusting up to 100 miles per hour (160 km/h) or more are common in the afternoons.

Surrounding areas have different climatic variations depending on location and elevation. Much of the area near Pikes Peak has a continental semiarid climate, while other areas would be classified as hemiboreal.

Climate data for Pikes Peak summit (elevation 14,115 ft)
Month	Jan	Feb	Mar	Apr	May	Jun	Jul	Aug	Sep	Oct	Nov	Dec	Year
Record high °F (°C)	30 (−1)	29 (−2)	43 (6)	39 (4)	47 (8)	63 (17)	64 (18)	62 (17)	55 (13)	47 (8)	36 (2)	30 (−1)	64 (18)
Mean daily maximum °F (°C)	8.1 (−13.3)	10.6 (−11.9)	14.0 (−10.0)	19.7 (−6.8)	28.4 (−2.0)	38.5 (3.6)	47.6 (8.7)	48.1 (8.9)	39.2 (4.0)	28.4 (−2.0)	16.0 (−8.9)	10.7 (−11.8)	25.8 (−3.4)
Mean daily minimum °F (°C)	−3.7 (−19.8)	−2.9 (−19.4)	−0.8 (−18.2)	4.6 (−15.2)	14.3 (−9.8)	24.6 (−4.1)	33.7 (0.9)	32.9 (0.5)	24.3 (−4.3)	14.2 (−9.9)	3.9 (−15.6)	−2.7 (−19.3)	11.9 (−11.2)
Record low °F (°C)	−37 (−38)	−37 (−38)	−29 (−34)	−21 (−29)	−8 (−22)	2 (−17)	18 (−8)	15 (−9)	6 (−14)	−17 (−27)	−36 (−38)	−39 (−39)	−39 (−39)
Average precipitation inches (mm)	1.56 (40)	1.39 (35)	2.11 (54)	3.78 (96)	3.68 (93)	1.77 (45)	4.46 (113)	3.92 (100)	1.77 (45)	1.41 (36)	1.84 (47)	1.49 (38)	29.18 (742)
Source: summitpost.org

Climate data for Pikes Peak 38.8392 N, 105.0424 W, Elevation: 13,675 ft (4,168 m) (interpolated 1991–2020 normals)
Month	Jan	Feb	Mar	Apr	May	Jun	Jul	Aug	Sep	Oct	Nov	Dec	Year
Mean daily maximum °F (°C)	22.1 (−5.5)	21.6 (−5.8)	26.5 (−3.1)	31.5 (−0.3)	39.3 (4.1)	50.3 (10.2)	55.5 (13.1)	52.9 (11.6)	47.3 (8.5)	38.8 (3.8)	28.8 (−1.8)	22.6 (−5.2)	36.4 (2.5)
Daily mean °F (°C)	10.3 (−12.1)	9.5 (−12.5)	13.9 (−10.1)	18.6 (−7.4)	26.8 (−2.9)	37.0 (2.8)	42.2 (5.7)	40.5 (4.7)	34.9 (1.6)	26.3 (−3.2)	17.5 (−8.1)	11.1 (−11.6)	24.1 (−4.4)
Mean daily minimum °F (°C)	−1.6 (−18.7)	−2.6 (−19.2)	1.3 (−17.1)	5.8 (−14.6)	14.4 (−9.8)	23.6 (−4.7)	28.8 (−1.8)	28.1 (−2.2)	22.4 (−5.3)	13.8 (−10.1)	6.2 (−14.3)	−0.4 (−18.0)	11.7 (−11.3)
Average precipitation inches (mm)	1.21 (31)	1.47 (37)	2.44 (62)	4.10 (104)	3.17 (81)	2.28 (58)	5.79 (147)	5.44 (138)	2.42 (61)	2.16 (55)	2.01 (51)	1.39 (35)	33.88 (860)
Source: PRISM Climate Group

== See also ==
- Cheyenne Mountain
- List of mountain peaks of North America
  - List of mountain peaks of the United States
    - List of mountain peaks of Colorado
      - List of Colorado county high points
      - List of Colorado fourteeners
      - List of Ultras of the United States
- Pikes Peak International Hill Climb
- Pikes Peak granite
