= List of ship launches in 2004 =

The list of ship launches in 2004 includes a chronological list of ships launched in 2004. In cases where no official launching ceremony was held, the date built or completed may be used instead.

Date	Ship	Class and type	Builder	Location	Country	Notes
January 7	Formidable	Formidable-class frigate	DCNS	Lorient	France	Republic of Singapore Navy
January 9	Halsey	Arleigh Burke-class destroyer	Ingalls Shipbuilding	Pascagoula, Mississippi	United States	United States Navy
January 22	Allegro	Sietas type 178 container ship	Schiffswerft J.J. Sietas	Hamburg-Neuenfelde	Germany	Reederei Winfried Eicke
February 9	Confianza	Sietas type 168 container ship	Schiffswerft J.J. Sietas	Hamburg-Neuenfelde	Germany	
February 15	OOCL Ningbo	OOCL SX-class container ship	Samsung Heavy Industries	Geoje	South Korea	(Hong Kong) Orient Overseas Container Line
February 25	Absalon	Absalon-class auxiliary frigate	Odense Staalskibsvaerft	Lindø	Denmark	Royal Danish Navy first ship of her class
February 25	Adrian Mærsk	Mærsk A-class container ship	Odense Staalskibsvaerft	Lindø	Denmark	(Denmark) Maersk Line
February 28	Rickmers Genoa	type Superflex Heavy MPC container ship	Xiamen Shipbuilding Industry	Xiamen	China	(Germany) Rickmers Group
March 8	Volcan de Tamasite	ferry	Astellios Hijos de J. Barreras	Vigo	Spain	(Spain) Naviera Armas
March 13	Jewel of the Seas	Radiance-class cruise ship	Meyer Werft	Papenburg	Germany	(United States) Royal Caribbean International
March 13	Lisa von Lübeck	Carrack			Germany	
March 14	Zelek Star	General cargo ship	Taizhou Yongtai Shipbuilding	Taixing	China	(Turkey) Fuden Shipping & Trading
March 20	Perth	Anzac-class frigate	Tenix Defence Systems	Williamstown	Australia	Royal Australian Navy
March 22	Pioneer Sea	Sietas type 178 container ship	Schiffswerft J.J. Sietas	Hamburg-Neuenfelde	Germany	
April 3	Nitze	Arleigh Burke-class destroyer	Bath Iron Works	Bath, Maine	United States	United States Navy
April 19	Mounts Bay	Bay-class landing ship dock	BAE Systems	Glasgow	United Kingdom	Royal Navy
April 22	Papanikolis	Type 214 submarine	HDW	Kiel	Germany	Hellenic Navy
April 22	Alana	Sietas type 178 container ship	Schiffswerft J.J. Sietas	Hamburg-Neuenfelde	Germany	(Germany) Peter Döhle Schiffahrts KG
April 28	MSC Stella	Sealand-New-York-type container ship	Hyundai Heavy Industries	Ulsan	South Korea	(Denmark) Maersk
1 May	Color Fantasy	Cruiseferry	Kvaerner Masa Yards	Turku	Finland	(Norway) Color Line largest cruiseferry in the world when delivered
13 May	Jimmy Carter	Seawolf-class submarine	Electric Boat	Groton, Connecticut	United States	United States Navy
15 May	Monte Cervantes	Monte-class container ship	Daewoo Shipbuilding & Marine Engineering	Okpo	South Korea	(Germany) Hamburg Süd
June 3	Fridtjof Nansen	Fridtjof Nansen-class frigate	Navantia	Ferrol	Spain	Royal Norwegian Navy
June 4	Satpura	Shivalik-class frigate	Mazagon Dock Limited	Mumbai	India	Indian Navy
June 15	Manthatisi	Type 209 submarine	Howaldtswerke-Deutsche Werft	Kiel	Germany	South African Navy
June 18	Arkona	Multi-purpose vessel	Peene-Werft	Wolgast	Germany	(Germany) Wasser- und Schifffahrtsamt Stralsund
June 21	Albert Mærsk	Mærsk A-class container ship	Odense Staalskibsvaerft	Lindø	Denmark	(Denmark) Maersk Line
June 26	Arcadia	Vista-class cruise ship	Fincantieri	Marghera	Italy	(United Kingdom) P&O Cruises
July 3	Intrepid	Formidable-class frigate	ST Engineering	Benoi	Singapore	Republic of Singapore Navy
July 20	Cavour	amphibious assault aircraft carrier	Fincantieri	Riva Trigoso	Italy	Italian Navy
July 27	Bianca Rambow	Sietas type 178 container ship	Schiffswerft J.J. Sietas	Hamburg-Neuenfelde	Germany	(Germany) Reederei Rambow
July 30	Monte Olivia	Monte-class container ship	Daewoo Shipbuilding & Marine Engineering	Okpo	South Korea	(Germany) Hamburg Süd
August 26	Suzunami	Takanami-class destroyer			Japan	Japan Maritime Self-Defense Force
August	U-33	Type 212 submarine	HDW	Kiel	Germany	German Navy
September 8	Geeststroom	Damen Container Feeder 800 container ship	Santierul Naval Damen Galati SA	Galați	Romania	
September 14	Akacia	Sietas type 178 container ship	Schiffswerft J.J. Sietas	Hamburg-Neuenfelde	Germany	(Germany) Peter Döhle Schiffahrts KG
October 2	Forrest Sherman	Arleigh Burke-class destroyer	Ingalls Shipbuilding	Pascagoula, Mississippi	United States	United States Navy
October 6	Mistral	Mistral-class amphibious assault ship	Brest Arsenal	Brest	France	French Navy
October 16	Julius-S.	VW 2500-type container ship	Volkswerft Stralsund	Stralsund	Germany	
October 18	Eilbek	Eilbek-class container ship	Meyer Werft	Papenburg	Germany	(Germany) Hansa Hamburg Shipping
October 18	Finnlandia	Sietas type 178 container ship	Schiffswerft J.J. Sietas	Hamburg-Neuenfelde	Germany	(Germany) Hammonia Reederei
October 25	Geestdijk	Damen Container Feeder 800 container ship	Santierul Naval Damen Galati SA	Galați	Romania	
October 30	Reinbek	Eilbek-class container ship	Meyer Werft	Papenburg	Germany	(Germany) Hansa Hamburg Shipping
October 30	Monte Pascoal	Monte-class container ship	Daewoo Shipbuilding & Marine Engineering	Okpo	South Korea	(Germany) Hamburg Süd
November 4	Yaeshio	Oyashio-class submarine			Japan	Japan Maritime Self-Defense Force
November 12	Méndez Núñez	Álvaro de Bazán-class frigate	Navatia	Ferrol	Spain	Spanish Navy
November 13	Bainbridge	Arleigh Burke-class destroyer	Bath Iron Works	Bath, Maine	United States	United States Navy
November 18	Volcan de Timanfaya	ferry	Astellios Hijos de J. Barreras	Vigo	Spain	(Spain) Naviera Armas
November 19	Mesa Verde	San Antonio-class amphibious transport dock	Ingalls Shipbuilding	Pascagoula, Mississippi	United States	United States Navy
November 24	Carrera	Scorpène-class submarine	Navantia	Cartagena	Spain	Chilean Navy
November 27	OOCL Atlanta	OOCL SX-class container ship	Samsung Heavy Industries	Geoje	South Korea	(Hong Kong) Orient Overseas Container Line
December 9	Cosco Brisbane	container ship	Blohm + Voss	Hamburg	Germany	(China) COSCO
December 11	New Orleans	San Antonio-class amphibious transport dock	Avondale Shipyard	New Orleans, Louisiana	United States	United States Navy
December 16	Härnösand	Visby-class corvette	Kockums	Malmö	Sweden	Swedish Navy
December 18	Scirè	Type 212 submarine	Fincantieri	Muggiano	Italy	Italian Navy
Unknown date	Angeln	Container ship	Zhoushan Shipyard	Zhoushan	China	(Germany) Brise Bereederungs GmbH & Co. KG
Unknown date	Jutul	Tanker	STX Offshore & Shipbuilding	Jinhae-gu	South Korea	Renamed the Maersk Peary in 2011 and leased to the Military Sealift Command
Unknown date	Corrine Marin	Barge	David Abels Boatbuilders Ltd.	Bristol	United Kingdom	For private owner.
Unknown date	Star Osakana	Container ship / bulk carrier	Oshima Shipbuilding		Japan	(Singapore) Masterbulk
