= Rio Negro (ship) =

South Korean container ship

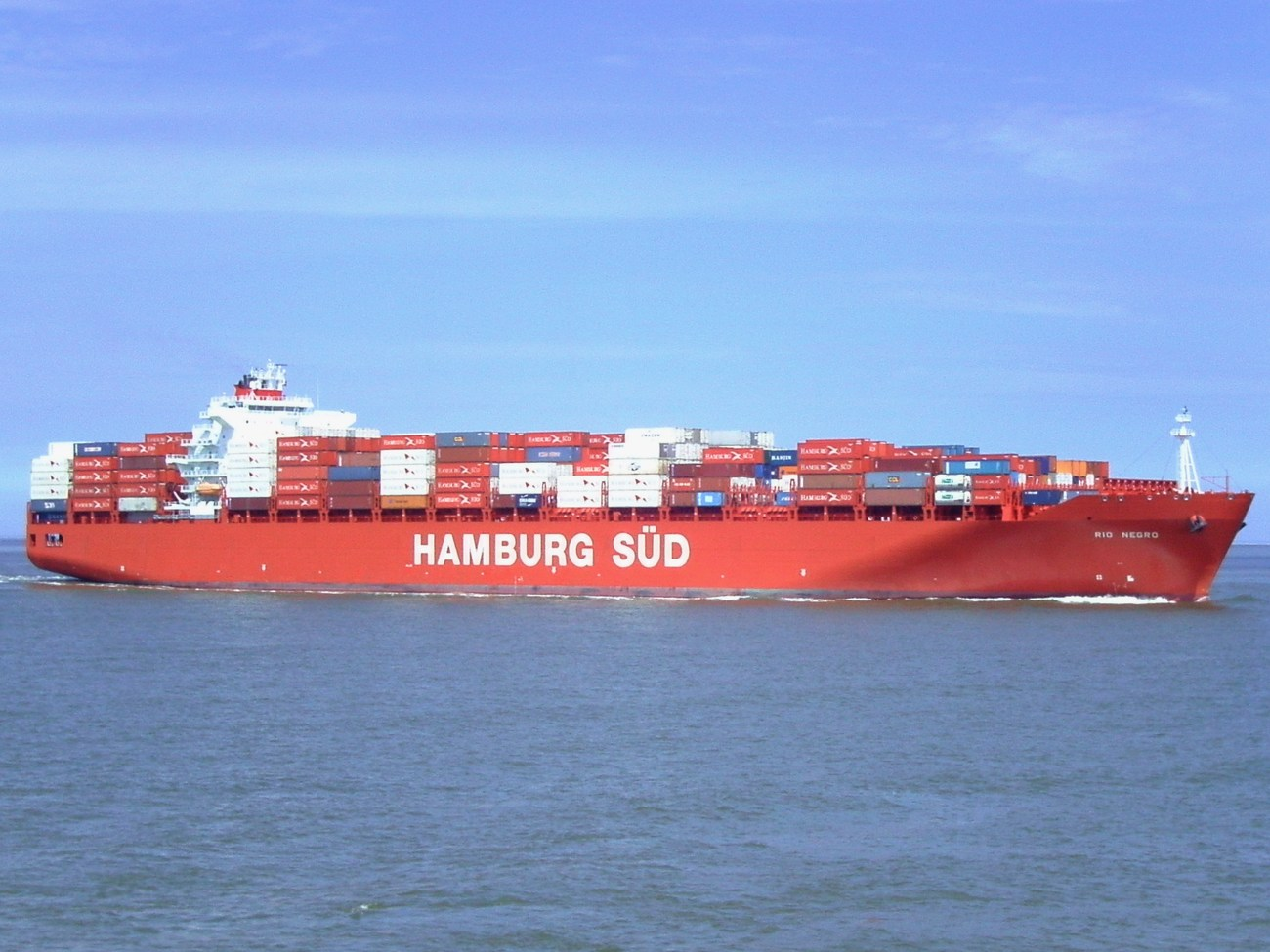
- Container ship Rio Negro

History

Singapore
- Name: 2018–present: Rio Negro
- Owner: A.P. Moller Singapore Pte. Ltd.
- Operator: Maersk Line AS
- Port of registry: Singapore as of 28 March 2018
- Route: Hamburg Süd Australia/New Zealand South East Asia (SENZ-Southern Loop) liner service
- Identification: IMO number: 9357975; MMSI number: 563052300; Callsign: 9V8402
- Status: In service

Germany
- Name: 2008–present: Rio Negro
- Owner: Rio Negro GmbH & Co KG
- Operator: Columbus Shipmanagement GmbH C/O Hamburg Suedamerikanische Dampfschiffahrts-Gesellschaft KG
- Port of registry: Germany as of 11 January 2008
- Builder: Daewoo Shipbuilding & Marine Engineering
- Laid down: 16 June 2008
- Launched: 30 August 2008
- Completed: 4 November 2008
- Identification: IMO number: 9357975

General characteristics
- Tonnage: 73,899 GT; 80,454.6 tonnes deadweight (DWT)
- Length: 286.45 m (939.8 ft)
- Beam: 40 m (131.2 ft)
- Depth: 24.2 m (79.4 ft)
- Ice class: D0
- Installed power: Hyundai Heavy Industries Engine and Machinery Division 8RTA96C
- Speed: 24.7 knots

Rio Negro is a container ship owned by A.P. Moller Singapore Pte. Ltd. and operated by Maersk Line AS. The 286.45-metre (939.8 ft) long ship was built at Daewoo Shipbuilding & Marine Engineering in Okpo, South Korea in 2008. Originally owned by Rio Negro GmbH & Co KG, a subsidiary of Hamburg Süd, she has had two owners and been registered under two flags.

The vessel is one of three ships of the Rio class built for Hamburg Süd by Daewoo Shipbuilding & Marine Engineering in 2008.

== Construction ==
Rio Negro had its keel laid down on 16 June 2008 at Daewoo Shipbuilding & Marine Engineering in Okpo, South Korea. Its hull has an overall length of 286.45 metres (939.8 ft). In terms of width, the ship has a beam of 40 metres (130 ft). The height from the top of the keel to the main deck, called the moulded depth, is 24.2 metres (79 ft).

The ship's container-carrying capacity of 5,905 twenty-foot equivalent units (TEU) (5,905 20-foot shipping containers) places it in the range of a Post-Panamax container ship. The ship's gross tonnage, a measure of the volume of all its enclosed spaces, is 73,899. Its net tonnage, which measures the volume of the cargo spaces, is 39,673. Its total carrying capacity in terms of weight, is 80,454.6 long tons deadweight (DWT).

The vessel was built with a Hyundai Heavy Industries Engine and Machinery Division 8RTA96C main engine, which drives a controllable-pitch propeller. The 8-cylinder engine has a Maximum Continuous Rating of 45,760 kW with 102 revolutions per minute at MCR. The cylinder bore is 960mm. The ship also features 4 main power distribution system auxiliary generators, 2 at 5,428.5-kilowatt (7,279.7 hp) each, and 2 at 4,071.4-kilowatt (5,459.8 hp). The vessel's steam piping system features an Aalborg CH 8-4500 auxiliary boiler, as well as an Aalborg AQ-2 exhaust gas boiler.

Construction of the ship was completed on 4 November 2008.
