= Monte Sarmiento (ship) =

South Korean container ship

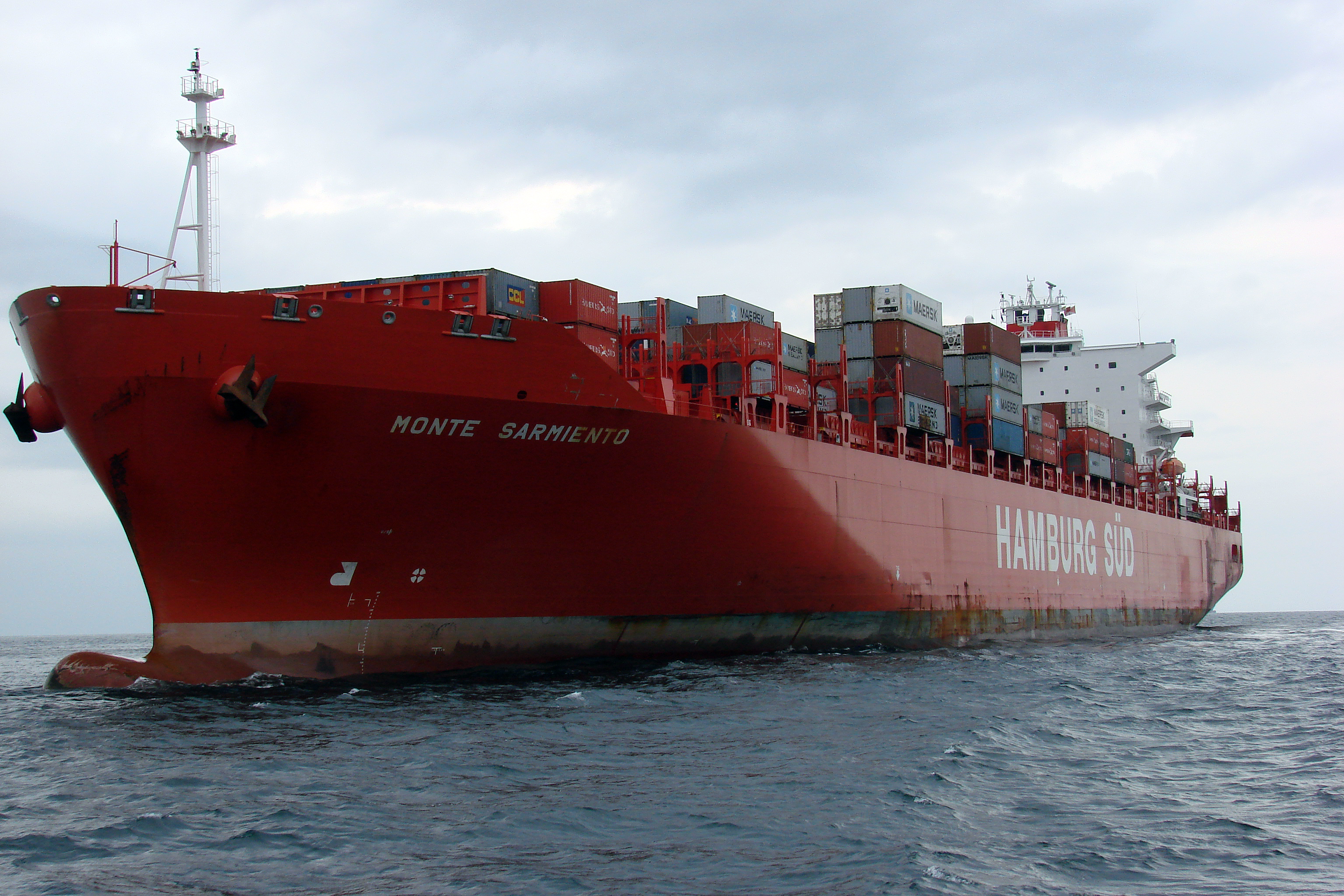
- Container ship Monte Sarmiento

History

Brazil
- Name: 2018–present: Monte Sarmiento
- Owner: Aliança Navegação
- Operator: Aliança Navegação
- Port of registry: Brazil
- Route: Hamburg Süd/Aliança Brazil Cabotage (ALCT2) liner service
- Identification: IMO number: 9283227; MMSI number: unknown; Callsign: 9V8403
- Status: In service

Singapore
- Name: 2018–2018: Monte Sarmiento
- Owner: A.P. Moller Singapore Pte. Ltd.
- Operator: Maersk Line AS
- Port of registry: Singapore
- Identification: IMO number: 9283227; MMSI number: 563050600; Callsign: 9V8403
- Status: In service

Germany
- Name: 2005–present: Monte Sarmiento
- Owner: 2017-2018: Reederei Monte GmbH & Co KG; 2005-2017: Santa Containerschiffe GmbH
- Operator: Columbus Shipmanagement GmbH C/O Hamburg Suedamerikanische Dampfschiffahrts-Gesellschaft KG
- Port of registry: Germany
- Builder: Daewoo Shipbuilding & Marine Engineering
- Laid down: 27 December 2004
- Completed: 2 June 2005
- Identification: IMO number: 9283227

General characteristics
- Tonnage: 69,132 GT; 71,438 tonnes deadweight (DWT)
- Length: 272 m (892.4 ft)
- Beam: 40 m (131.2 ft)
- Depth: 24.2 m (79.4 ft)
- Installed power: Wartsila Nederland B.V. 8RTA96C
- Speed: 23 knots

Monte Sarmiento is a container ship owned and operated by Aliança Navegação, a subsidiary of A.P. Moller Singapore Pte. Ltd. The 272-metre (892 ft) long ship was built at Daewoo Shipbuilding & Marine Engineering in Okpo, South Korea in 2004/2005. Originally owned by Santa Containerschiffe GmbH, a subsidiary of Hamburg Süd, she has had four owners and been registered under three flags.

The vessel is one of ten ships of the Monte class built for Hamburg Süd by Daewoo Shipbuilding & Marine Engineering and Daewoo Mangalia Heavy Industries between 2004 and 2009. Its new name is Maersk Monte Alto, sailing under the flag of Singapore.

== Construction ==
Monte Sarmiento had its keel laid down on 27 December 2004 at Daewoo Shipbuilding & Marine Engineering in Okpo, South Korea. Its hull has an overall length of 272 metres (892 ft). In terms of width, the ship has a beam of 40 metres (130 ft). The height from the top of the keel to the main deck, called the moulded depth, is 24.2 metres (79 ft).

The ship's container-carrying capacity of 5,552 twenty-foot equivalent units (TEU) (5,552 20-foot shipping containers) places it in the range of a Post-Panamax container ship. The ship's gross tonnage, a measure of the volume of all its enclosed spaces, is 69,132. Its net tonnage, which measures the volume of the cargo spaces, is 34,823. Its total carrying capacity in terms of weight, is 71,438 long tons deadweight (DWT).

The vessel was built with a Wartsila Nederland B.V. 8RTA96C main engine, which drives a controllable-pitch propeller. The 8-cylinder engine has a Maximum Continuous Rating of 45,760 kW with 102 revolutions per minute at MCR. The cylinder bore is 960mm. The ship also features 4 main power distribution system auxiliary generators, 3 at 4,100-kilowatt (5,500 hp), and 1 at 2,700-kilowatt (3,600 hp). The vessel's steam piping system features an Aalborg CH 8-500 auxiliary boiler.

Construction of the ship was completed on 2 June 2005. The ship is classified by the ABS with the code "A1, Container Carrier, AMS, ACCU; RRDA, BWE, UWILD, PMP", meaning that it was constructed under the supervision of a recognized classification society, that the construction complies with the society's rules, and that it is classed as a general cargo carrier and container ship.

After a fire broke out in the engine room the ship has been at anchor in Babitonga Bay Sao Francisco do Sul, awaiting for repairs for more than two months.
