= Monte Tamaro (ship) =

South Korean container ship

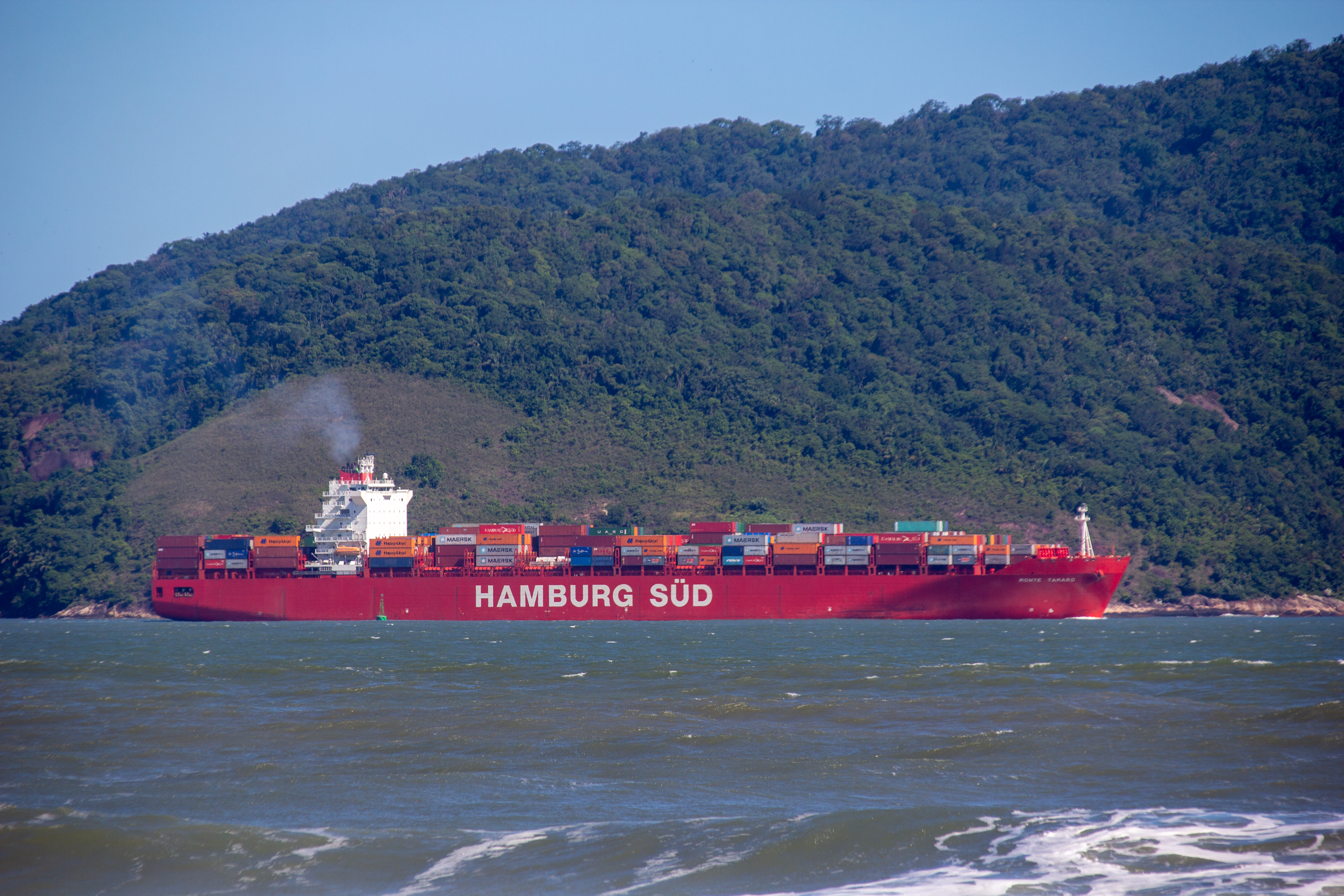
- Container ship Monte Tamaro seen from Santos in 2018

History

Singapore
- Name: 2018–present: Monte Tamaro
- Owner: A.P. Moller Singapore Pte. Ltd.
- Operator: Maersk Line AS
- Port of registry: Singapore as of 5 April 2018
- Route: Hamburg Süd North America East Coast - South America East Coast (ASUS) liner service
- Identification: IMO number: 9357949; MMSI number: 563052100; Callsign: 9V6123
- Status: In service

Portugal
- Name: 2015–present: Monte Tamaro
- Owner: 2007-2018: Monte Tamaro GmbH & Co KG
- Operator: Columbus Shipmanagement GmbH C/O Hamburg Suedamerikanische Dampfschiffahrts-Gesellschaft KG
- Port of registry: Madeira, Portugal as of 10 January 2015

Germany
- Name: 2007–present: Monte Tamaro
- Owner: 2007-2018: Monte Tamaro GmbH & Co KG
- Operator: Columbus Shipmanagement GmbH C/O Hamburg Suedamerikanische Dampfschiffahrts-Gesellschaft KG
- Port of registry: Germany as of 11 January 2007
- Builder: Daewoo Shipbuilding & Marine Engineering
- Laid down: 26 June 2007
- Launched: 22 September 2007
- Completed: 30 November 2007
- Identification: IMO number: 9357949

General characteristics
- Tonnage: 69,132 GT; 71,587 tonnes deadweight (DWT)
- Length: 272 m (892.4 ft)
- Beam: 40 m (131.2 ft)
- Depth: 24.2 m (79.4 ft)
- Ice class: D0
- Installed power: HSD Engine Co. Ltd. 8RTA96C-B
- Speed: 23 knots

Monte Tamaro is a container ship owned by A.P. Moller Singapore Pte. Ltd. and operated by Maersk Line AS. The 272-metre (892 ft) long ship was built at Daewoo Shipbuilding & Marine Engineering in Okpo, South Korea in 2007. Originally owned by Monte Tamaro GmbH & Co KG, a subsidiary of Hamburg Süd, she has had two owners and been registered under three flags.

The vessel is one of ten ships of the Monte class built for Hamburg Süd by Daewoo Shipbuilding & Marine Engineering and Daewoo Mangalia Heavy Industries between 2004 and 2009.

== Construction ==
Monte Tamaro had its keel laid down on 26 June 2007 at Daewoo Shipbuilding & Marine Engineering in Okpo, South Korea. Its hull has an overall length of 272 metres (892 ft). In terms of width, the ship has a beam of 40 metres (130 ft). The height from the top of the keel to the main deck, called the moulded depth, is 24.2 metres (79 ft).

The ship's container-carrying capacity of 5,552 twenty-foot equivalent units (TEU) (5,552 20-foot shipping containers) places it in the range of a Post-Panamax container ship. The ship's gross tonnage, a measure of the volume of all its enclosed spaces, is 69,132. Its net tonnage, which measures the volume of the cargo spaces, is 34,823. Its total carrying capacity in terms of weight, is 71,587.5 long tons deadweight (DWT).

The vessel was built with a HSD Engine Co. Ltd. 8RTA96C-B main engine, which drives a fixed-pitch propeller. The 8-cylinder engine has a Maximum Continuous Rating of 45,760 kW with 102 revolutions per minute at MCR. The cylinder bore is 960mm. The ship also features 4 main power distribution system auxiliary generators, 3 at 4,100-kilowatt (5,500 hp), and 1 at 2,700-kilowatt (3,600 hp). The vessel's steam piping system features an Aalborg CH 8-500 auxiliary boiler.

Construction of the ship was completed on 30 November 2007. As of 2018, the ship is classified by the ABS with the code "A1, Container Carrier, AMS, ACCU; RRDA, BWE, Ice Class D0, UWILD, PMP", meaning that it was constructed under the supervision of a recognized classification society, that the construction complies with the society's rules, and that it is classed as a general cargo carrier and container ship.
