= Rio Bravo (ship) =

Romanian container ship

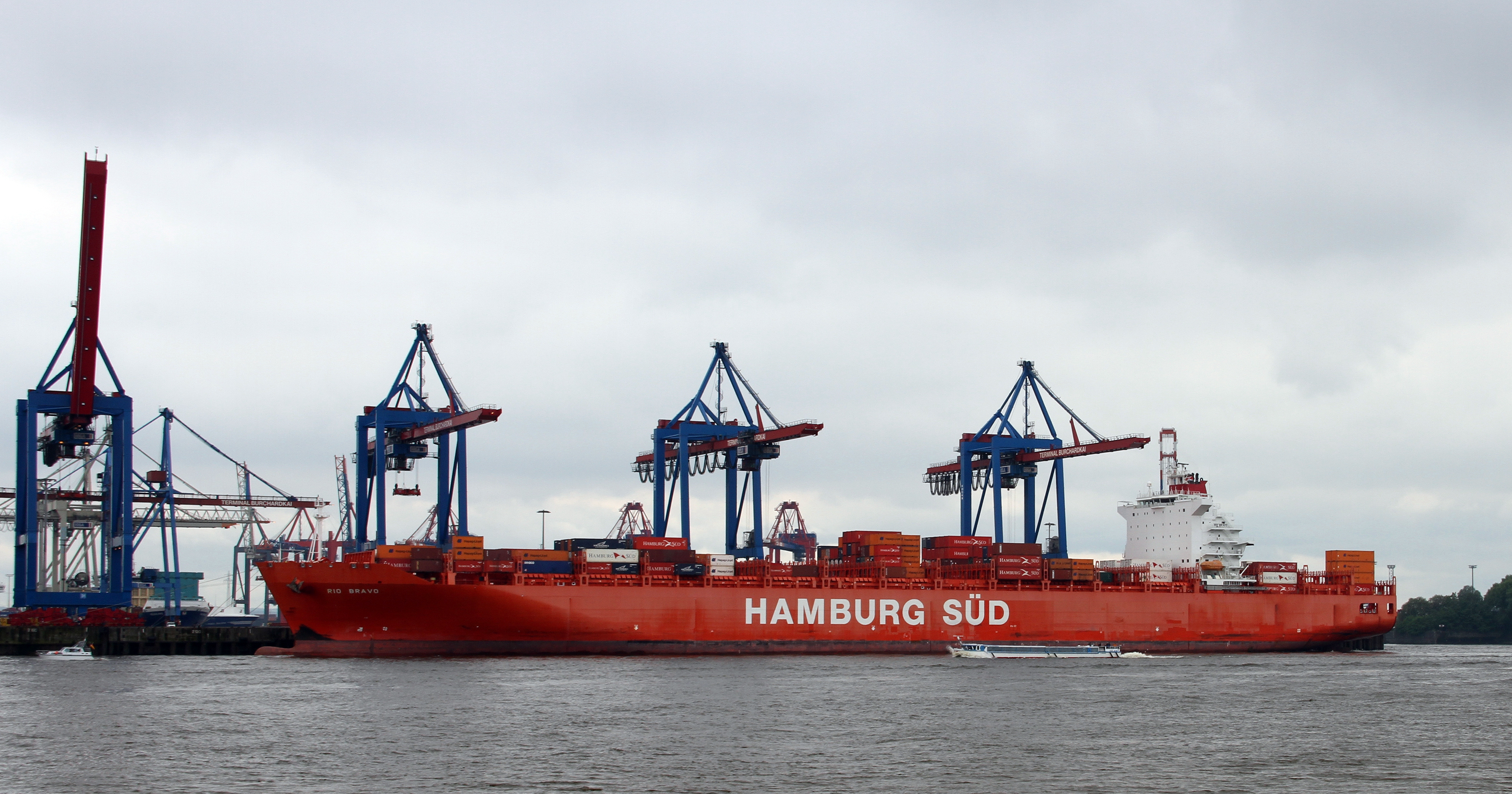
- Container ship Rio Bravo

History

Singapore
- Name: 2018–present: Rio Bravo
- Owner: A.P. Moller Singapore Pte. Ltd.
- Operator: Maersk Line AS
- Port of registry: Singapore as of 13 March 2018
- Route: Hamburg Süd North Europe - South Mediterranean (NESM) liner service; Hamburg Süd Australia/New Zealand South East Asia (SENZ-Southern Loop) liner service
- Identification: IMO number: 9348091; MMSI number: 563050300; Callsign: 9V8092
- Status: In service

History

Liberia
- Name: 2011–present: Rio Bravo
- Owner: Rio Bravo GmbH & Co KG
- Operator: Columbus Shipmanagement GmbH C/O Hamburg Suedamerikanische Dampfschiffahrts-Gesellschaft KG
- Port of registry: Monrovia, Liberia as of 11 January 2011

Germany
- Name: 2009–present: Rio Bravo
- Owner: Rio Bravo GmbH & Co KG
- Operator: Columbus Shipmanagement GmbH C/O Hamburg Suedamerikanische Dampfschiffahrts-Gesellschaft KG
- Port of registry: Germany as of 8 January 2009
- Builder: Daewoo Mangalia Heavy Industries
- Laid down: 7 July 2008
- Launched: 12 March 2009
- Completed: 18 August 2009
- Identification: IMO number: 9348091

General characteristics
- Tonnage: 80,225 t DWT
- Length: 286.45 m (939 ft 10 in)
- Beam: 40 m (131 ft 3 in)
- Depth: 24.2 m (79 ft 5 in)
- Ice class: D0
- Installed power: Doosan Engine Co. Ltd. 8RTA96C
- Speed: 23 knots (43 km/h; 26 mph)

Rio Bravo is a container ship owned by A.P. Moller Singapore Pte. Ltd. and operated by Maersk Line AS. The 286.45-metre (939.8 ft) long ship was built at Daewoo Mangalia Heavy Industries in Mangalia, Romania in 2009. Originally owned by Rio Bravo GmbH & Co KG, a subsidiary of Hamburg Süd, she has had two owners and been registered under three flags.

The vessel is one of three ships of the Rio class built for Hamburg Süd by Daewoo Mangalia Heavy Industries in 2009.

== Construction ==
Rio Bravo had its keel laid down on 7 July 2008 at Daewoo Mangalia Heavy Industries in Mangalia, Romania. Its hull has an overall length of 286.45 metres (939.8 ft). In terms of width, the ship has a beam of 40 metres (130 ft). The height from the top of the keel to the main deck, called the moulded depth, is 24.2 metres (79 ft).

The ship's container-carrying capacity of 5,905 twenty-foot equivalent units (TEU) (5,905 20-foot shipping containers) places it in the range of a Post-Panamax container ship. The ship's gross tonnage, a measure of the volume of all its enclosed spaces, is 73,899. Its net tonnage, which measures the volume of the cargo spaces, is 39,673. Its total carrying capacity in terms of weight, is 80,225.8 long tons deadweight (DWT).

The vessel was built with a Doosan Engine Co. Ltd. 8RTA96C main engine, which drives a fixed pitch propeller. The 8-cylinder engine has a Maximum Continuous Rating of 45,765 kW with 102 revolutions per minute at MCR. The cylinder bore is 960mm. The ship also features 4 main power distribution system auxiliary generators, 2 at 5,428.5-kilowatt (7,279.7 hp), and 2 at 4,071.4-kilowatt (5,459.8 hp). The vessel's steam piping system features an Aalborg CH 8-500 auxiliary boiler.

Construction of the ship was completed on 18 August 2009.
