= Monte Olivia (ship) =

South Korean container ship

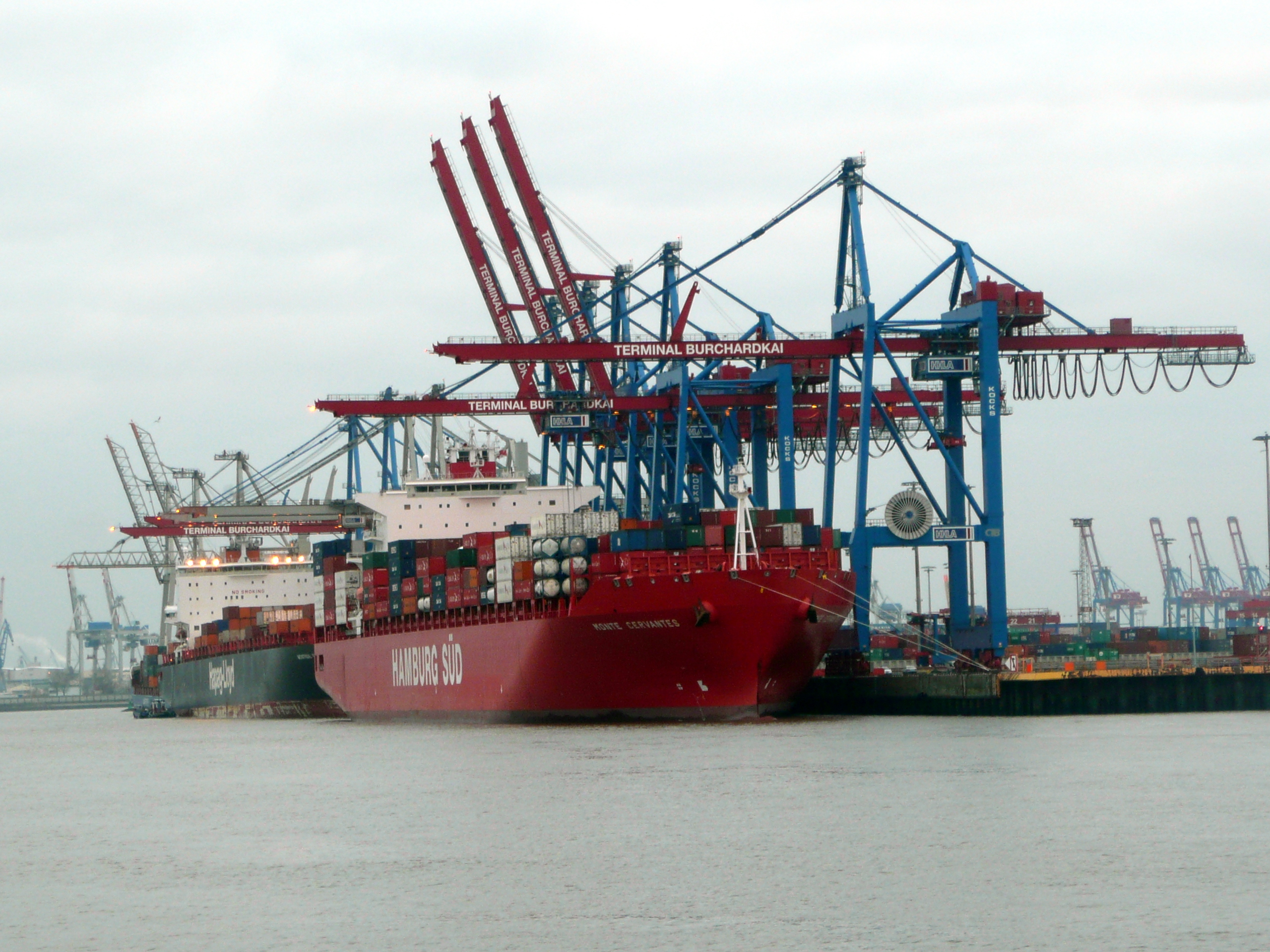
- Container ship Monte Cervantes, sister ship to Monte Olivia

History

Singapore
- Name: 2018–present: Monte Olivia
- Owner: A.P. Moller Singapore Pte. Ltd.
- Operator: Maersk Line AS
- Port of registry: Singapore as of 17 April 2018
- Route: Hamburg Süd US Gulf/Central America/Caribbean - South America East Coast (UCLA 1) liner service
- Identification: IMO number: 9283198; MMSI number: 563052500; Callsign: 9V6839
- Status: In service

Germany
- Name: 2004–present: Monte Olivia
- Owner: Reederei Monte GmbH & Co KG
- Operator: Columbus Shipmanagement GmbH C/O Hamburg Suedamerikanische Dampfschiffahrts-Gesellschaft KG
- Port of registry: Germany as of 10 January 2004
- Builder: Daewoo Shipbuilding & Marine Engineering
- Laid down: 17 May 2004
- Launched: 30 July 2004
- Completed: 14 October 2004
- Identification: IMO number: 9283198

General characteristics
- Tonnage: 69,132 GT; 71,372.9 t DWT
- Length: 272 m (892 ft 5 in)
- Beam: 40 m (131 ft 3 in)
- Depth: 24.2 m (79 ft 5 in)
- Installed power: HSD Engine Co. Ltd. 8RTA96C-B
- Speed: 23 knots (43 km/h; 26 mph)

Monte Olivia is a container ship owned by A.P. Moller Singapore Pte. Ltd. and operated by Maersk Line AS. The 272-metre (892 ft 5 in) long ship was built at Daewoo Shipbuilding & Marine Engineering in Okpo, South Korea in 2004. Originally owned by Reederei Monte GmbH & Co KG, a subsidiary of Hamburg Süd, she has had two owners and been registered under two flags.

The vessel is one of ten ships of the Monte class built for Hamburg Süd by Daewoo Shipbuilding & Marine Engineering and Daewoo Mangalia Heavy Industries between 2004 and 2009.

== Construction ==
Monte Olivia had its keel laid down on 17 May 2004 at Daewoo Shipbuilding & Marine Engineering in Okpo, South Korea. Its hull has an overall length of 272 metres (892 ft). In terms of width, the ship has a beam of 40 metres (130 ft). The height from the top of the keel to the main deck, called the moulded depth, is 24.2 metres (79 ft).

The ship's container-carrying capacity of 5,552 twenty-foot equivalent units (TEU) (5,552 20-foot shipping containers) places it in the range of a Post-Panamax container ship. The ship's gross tonnage, a measure of the volume of all its enclosed spaces, is 69,132. Its net tonnage, which measures the volume of the cargo spaces, is 34,823. Its total carrying capacity in terms of weight, is 71,372.9 long tons deadweight (DWT).

The vessel was built with a HSD Engine Co. Ltd. 8RTA96C-B main engine, which drives a controllable-pitch propeller. The 8-cylinder engine has a Maximum Continuous Rating of 45,760 kW (61,370 hp) with 102 revolutions per minute at MCR. The cylinder bore is 960mm. The ship also features four main power distribution system auxiliary generators, three at 4,100 kilowatts (5,500 hp), and one at 2,700 kilowatts (3,600 hp). The vessel's steam piping system features an Aalborg CH 8-500 auxiliary boiler.

Construction of the ship was completed on 14 October 2004.
