= Tamaro =

Tamaro is a surname. Notable people with the surname include:

- Janet Tamaro, American television writer, series creator, executive producer and showrunner
- Susanna Tamaro (born 1957), Italian novelist

== See also ==
- Monte Tamaro, a mountain of the Lugano Prealps, overlooking Lake Maggiore in the Swiss canton of Ticino
- Monte Tamaro (ship), a container ship owned by A.P. Moller Singapore Pte. Ltd. and operated by Maersk Line AS
