= Rio Madeira (ship) =

South Korean container ship

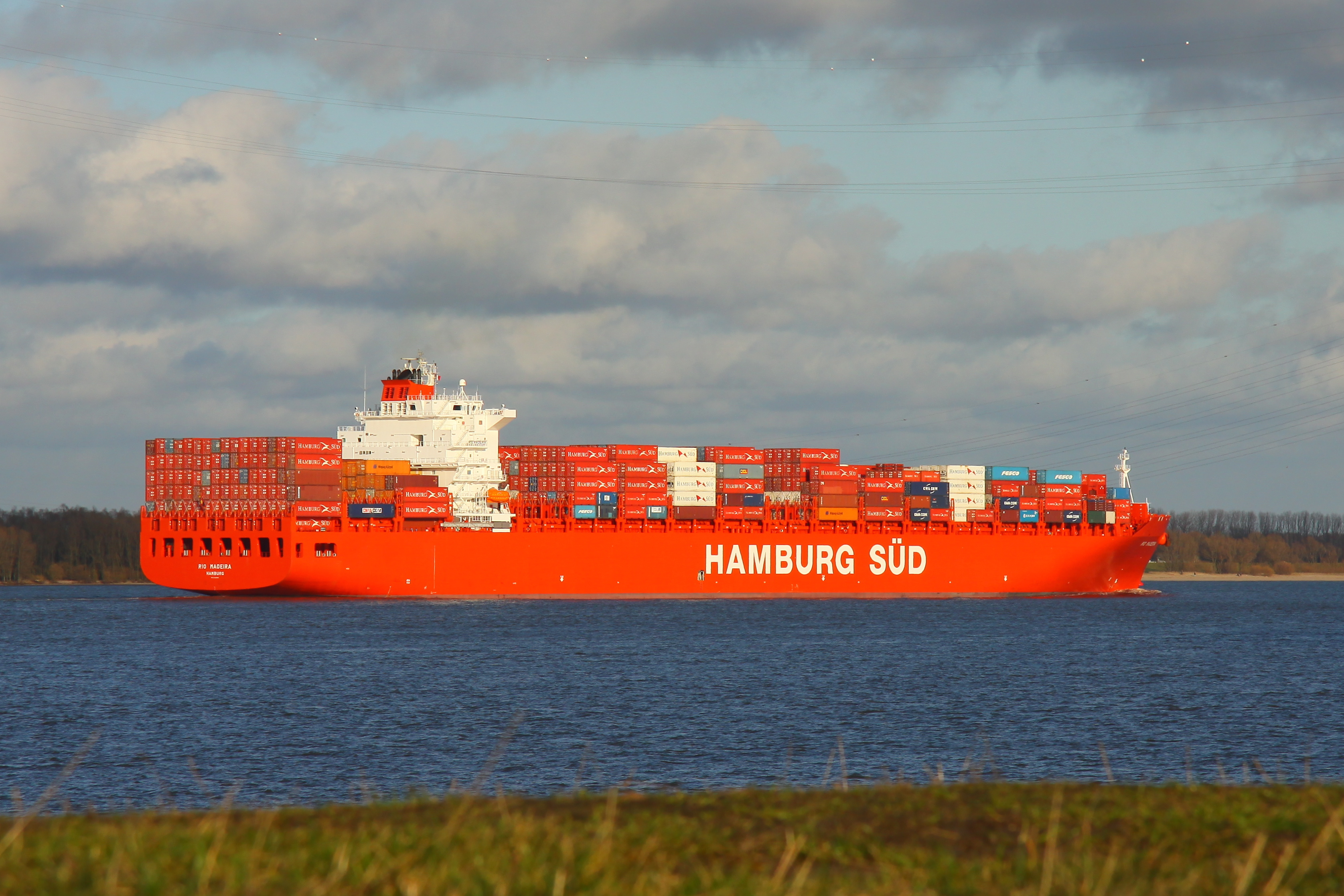
- Container ship Rio Madeira

History

Singapore
- Name: 2018–present: Rio Madeira
- Owner: A.P. Moller Singapore Pte. Ltd.
- Operator: Maersk Line AS
- Port of registry: Singapore as of 20 March 2018
- Route: Hamburg Süd Asia – South America East Coast ASIA 2 / New Good Hope Express liner service; Hamburg Süd Australia/New Zealand South East Asia (SENZ-Southern Loop) liner service
- Identification: IMO number: 9348106; MMSI number: 563051600; Callsign: 9VJZ6
- Status: In service

Liberia
- Name: 2014–present: Rio Madeira
- Owner: Rio Madeira GmbH & Co KG
- Operator: Columbus Shipmanagement GmbH C/O Hamburg Suedamerikanische Dampfschiffahrts-Gesellschaft KG
- Port of registry: Monrovia, Liberia as of 6 January 2014

Germany
- Name: 2009–present: Rio Madeira
- Owner: Rio Madeira GmbH & Co KG
- Operator: Columbus Shipmanagement GmbH C/O Hamburg Suedamerikanische Dampfschiffahrts-Gesellschaft KG
- Port of registry: Germany as of 11 January 2009
- Builder: Daewoo Mangalia Heavy Industries
- Yard number: Elbe 17
- Laid down: 22 September 2008
- Launched: 5 August 2009
- Completed: 10 November 2009
- Identification: IMO number: 9348106

General characteristics
- Tonnage: 73,899 GT; 80,300 t DWT
- Length: 286.45 m (939 ft 10 in)
- Beam: 40 m (131 ft 3 in)
- Depth: 24.2 m (79 ft 5 in)
- Ice class: D0
- Installed power: Doosan Engine Co. Ltd. 8RTA96C
- Speed: 23 knots (43 km/h; 26 mph)

Rio Madeira is a container ship owned by A.P. Moller Singapore Pte. Ltd. and operated by Maersk Line AS. The 286.45-metre (939.8 ft) long ship was built at Daewoo Mangalia Heavy Industries in Mangalia, Romania in 2009. Originally owned by Rio Madeira GmbH & Co KG, a subsidiary of Hamburg Süd, she has had two owners and been registered under three flags.

The vessel is one of three ships of the Rio class built for Hamburg Süd by Daewoo Mangalia Heavy Industries in 2009.

== Construction ==
Rio Madeira had its keel laid down on 22 September 2008. at Daewoo Mangalia Heavy Industries in Mangalia, Romania. Its hull has an overall length of 286.45 metres (939.8 ft). In terms of width, the ship has a beam of 40 metres (130 ft). The height from the top of the keel to the main deck, called the moulded depth, is 24.2 metres (79 ft).

The ship's container-carrying capacity of 5,905 twenty-foot equivalent units (TEU) (5,905 20-foot shipping containers) places it in the range of a Post-Panamax container ship. The ship's gross tonnage, a measure of the volume of all its enclosed spaces, is 73,899. Its net tonnage, which measures the volume of the cargo spaces, is 39,673. Its total carrying capacity in terms of weight, is 80,300 long tons deadweight (DWT).

The vessel was built with a Doosan Engine Co. Ltd. 8RTA96C main engine, which drives a controllable-pitch propeller. The 8-cylinder engine has a Maximum Continuous Rating of 45,765 kW with 102 revolutions per minute at MCR. The cylinder bore is 960mm. The ship also features 4 main power distribution system auxiliary generators, 2 at 5,428.5-kilowatt (7,279.7 hp), and 2 at 4,071.4-kilowatt (5,459.8 hp). The vessel's steam piping system features an Aalborg CH 8-500 auxiliary boiler, as well as an Aalborg AQ-2 exhaust gas boiler.

Construction of the ship was completed on 10 November 2009.

== 2022 power failure and subsequent stranding ==
On the night of 20 October 2022, off the coast of New South Wales, Australia, the Rio Madeira sustained a power failure and subsequently became stranded, drifting south 70 kilometres (43 mi) east of Narooma. The Australian Maritime Safety Authority responded, with an emergency vessel from Newcastle expected to arrive on the afternoon of 22 October.
