= Monte Cervantes =

A number of ships have been named Monte Cervantes, including:

- MV Monte Cervantes, German passenger liner, launched 1927, sank 1930
- Monte Cervantes (2004 ship), Maersk container ship
