= List of ships named Monte Pascoal =

A number of motor vessels have been named Monte Pascoal, after the mountain in Brazil, including –

- MV Monte Pascoal (1930), a Hamburg Süd ocean liner
- MV Monte Pascoal (1980), a Hamburg Süd container ship
- Monte Pascoal (2004 ship), a Hamburg Süd container ship

== See also ==
- Monte Pascoal, a mountain near Porto Seguro, Bahia, Brazil
