= Atherton International School =

Coordinates: 34.88804°N 128.69016°E

Atherton International School (애서튼 국제학교)
- Okpo, Geoje South Gyeongsang Province; South Korea

Information
- Former names: Okpo International School; International School of Koje
- Type: Independent; International School
- Grades: Year 1 - Year 13
- Website: www.atherton.sc.kr

Atherton International School (AIS) is a privately funded international school located in Okpo, Geoje, South Korea. Founded in 2002 as Okpo International School their name changed to The International School of Koje (ISK) in 2014, before gaining its current name in 2022. Currently, as of 2026, they are accredited for the English National Curriculum for Early Years, Primary school, and Middle school, as well as IGCSEs and A levels for older students.
