= Monte Pascoal (2004 ship) =

South Korean container ship

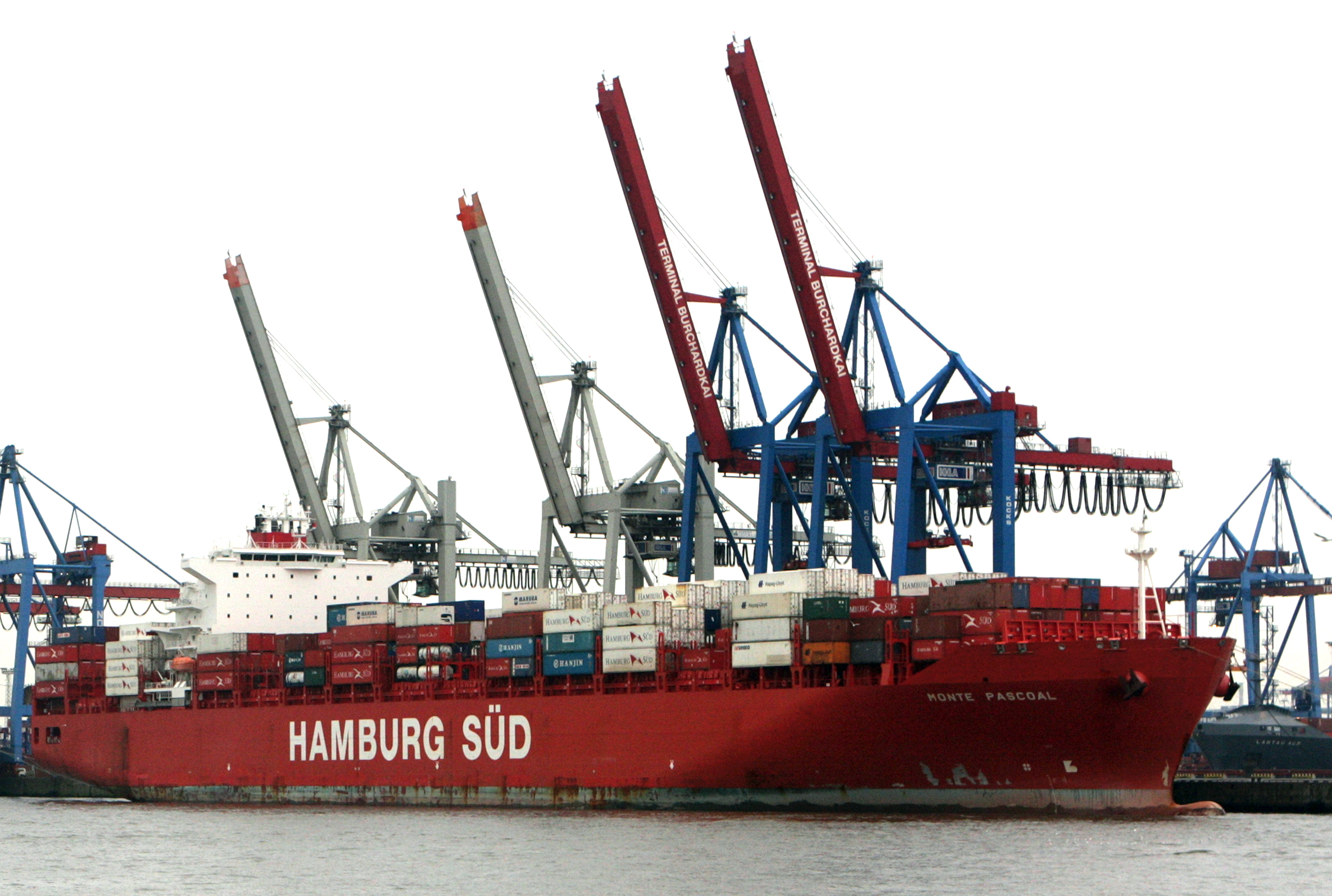
- Container ship Monte Pascoal

History

Singapore
- Name: 2018–present: Monte Pascoal
- Owner: A.P. Moller Singapore Pte. Ltd.
- Operator: Maersk Line AS
- Port of registry: Singapore as of 19 March 2018
- Route: Hamburg Süd US Gulf/Central America/Caribbean - South America East Coast (UCLA 1) liner service
- Identification: IMO number: 9283203; MMSI number: 563051300; Callsign: 9V8586
- Status: In service

Germany
- Name: 2006–present: Monte Pascoal; 2005–2006: P&O Nedlloyd Lambada; 2004–2005: Monte Pascoal
- Owner: Monte Pascoal GmbH
- Operator: Columbus Shipmanagement GmbH C/O Hamburg Suedamerikanische Dampfschiffahrts-Gesellschaft KG
- Port of registry: Germany as of 1 January 2005
- Builder: Daewoo Shipbuilding & Marine Engineering
- Laid down: 9 August 2004
- Launched: 30 October 2004
- Completed: 5 January 2005
- Identification: IMO number: 9283203

General characteristics
- Tonnage: 69,132 GT; 71,475.9 tonnes deadweight (DWT)
- Length: 272 m (892.4 ft)
- Beam: 40 m (131.2 ft)
- Depth: 24.2 m (79.4 ft)
- Installed power: HSD Engine Co. Ltd. 8RTA96C-B
- Speed: 23 knots

Monte Pascoal is a container ship owned by A.P. Moller Singapore Pte. Ltd. and operated by Maersk Line AS. The 272-metre (892 ft) long ship was built at Daewoo Shipbuilding & Marine Engineering in Okpo, South Korea in 2004. Originally owned by Monte Pascoal GmbH, a subsidiary of Hamburg Süd, she has had two owners and been registered under two flags.

The vessel is one of ten ships of the Monte class built for Hamburg Süd by Daewoo Shipbuilding & Marine Engineering and Daewoo Mangalia Heavy Industries between 2004 and 2009.

== Construction ==
Monte Pascoal had its keel laid down on 9 August 2004 at Daewoo Shipbuilding & Marine Engineering in Okpo, South Korea. Its hull has an overall length of 272 metres (892 ft). In terms of width, the ship has a beam of 40 metres (130 ft). The height from the top of the keel to the main deck, called the moulded depth, is 24.2 metres (79 ft).

The ship's container-carrying capacity of 5,552 twenty-foot equivalent units (TEU) (5,552 20-foot shipping containers) places it in the range of a Post-Panamax container ship. The ship's gross tonnage, a measure of the volume of all its enclosed spaces, is 69,132. Its net tonnage, which measures the volume of the cargo spaces, is 34,823. Its total carrying capacity in terms of weight, is 71,475.9 long tons deadweight (DWT).

The vessel was built with a HSD Engine Co. Ltd. 8RTA96C-B main engine, which drives a controllable-pitch propeller. The 8-cylinder engine has a Maximum Continuous Rating of 45,760 kW with 102 revolutions per minute at MCR. The cylinder bore is 960mm. The ship also features 4 main power distribution system auxiliary generators, 3 at 4,100-kilowatt (5,500 hp), and 1 at 2,700-kilowatt (3,600 hp). The vessel's steam piping system features an Aalborg CH 8-500 auxiliary boiler.

Construction of the ship was completed on 5 January 2005.
