= Okpo Land =

1996–1999 amusement park in South Korea

- Interactive map of Okpo Land
- Location: Okpo-dong, Geoje, South Gyeongsang Province, South Korea
- Coordinates: 34°53′37.1″N 128°42′01.5″E
- Status: Defunct
- Opened: February 1996
- Closed: May 1999
- Owner: Okpo Resort Co., Ltd.
- Operated by: Okpo Resort Co., Ltd.
- Area: 32.6 acres (13.2 ha)

Attractions
- Total: 11
- Roller coasters: 1

Okpo Land (Korean: 옥포랜드; RR: Okporaendeu; MR: Okp'oraendŭ) was an amusement park based in the outskirts of Okpo-dong, Geoje city, South Gyeongsang Province, South Korea. While not much is known about the park's history, it opened in 1996 (stated by some sources to have been in May 1997) and closed in 1999 allegedly after a series of fatal accidents, in particular the death of a child who fell from the duck sky cycles ride. The legitimacy of these claims have been put in dispute for several years, with the rumors believed to be originating from an accident in which an elementary school student fell from the Sky Cycle rails after the amusement park went out of business. A more likely reasoning behind the closure of the park is said to have been due to financial issues deriving from an economic crisis that affected South Korea from 1997 through 1998.

During the time it was neglected for a long while, thanks to its unique environment as an abandoned amusement park after closure, it became the filming location for the 2002 Korean film Jungle Juice and a gathering place for survival clubs.

In November 2000, the park was sold off to someone referred to as "Mr. Park", and although there were two seizures and a provisional registration of a claim for transfer of ownership, they were cancelled. The nearby Daewoo Shipbuilding & Marine Engineering Co., Ltd. also purchased the property in November 2006 for 5 billion won.

In 2011, the remnants of Okpo Land were demolished so that a hotel can be constructed on its former location. Although, nothing further has come forward.

== Attractions ==
1. Viking (Korean: 바이킹; RR: Baiking; MR: Paik'ing) - Pirate ship
2. Bambi Cars (Korean: 밤비카; RR: Bambika; MR: Pambik'a) - Bumper cars
3. Fantasy Express (Korean: 환상특급; Hanja: 幻想特急; RR: Hwansangteukgeub; MR: Hwansangt'ŭkkŭp) - Squirrel roller coaster
4. Squirrel Buckets (Korean: 다람쥐통; RR: Daramjwitong; MR: Taramjwit'ong) - Rock'n Roll
5. Merry-Go-Round (Korean: 회전목마; Hanja: 回轉木馬; RR: Hoejeonmokma; MR: Hoejŏnmongma) - Carousel
6. Roller skating rink (Korean: 롤러스케이트장; RR: Rolleoseukeiteujang; MR: Rollŏsŭk'eit'ŭjang)
7. Four-seasons sledding slope (Korean: 사계절 썰매장; RR: Sagyejeol sseolmaejang; MR: Sagyejŏl ssŏlmaejang)
8. Sky Cycles (Korean: 스카이 싸이클; RR: Seukai ssaikeul; MR: Sŭk'ai ssaik'ŭl) - Duck ride
9. Battery Cars (Korean: 밧데리카; RR: Batderika; MR: Patterik'a) - Children's bumper cars
10. Mini Train (Korean: 미니기차; RR: Minigicha; MR: Minigich'a) - Train ride
11. Space Fighters (Korean: 우주전투기; Hanja: 宇宙戰鬪機; RR: Ujujeontugi; MR: Ujujŏnt'ugi) - Circular ride

The park also featured an arcade area, a swimming pool, sauna and hot tubs.

== Incidents and Accidents ==
In January 2000, after Okpo Land went out of business, an elementary school student fell while playing on the rails of the Fantasy Express or Sky Cycles and suffered serious injuries, and the business owner paid about 7 million won in damages.

On September 18, 2001, at 6:30 PM, a 29-year-old man was found hanging from the rails of the Fantasy Express or Sky Cycles; it is suspected that he took his own life because he could not pay his overdue credit card debt.

In 2011, a fire broke out amongst the arcade area which was believed by locals to have been done by arsonists.

== Notes ==
- The park's entrance sign featured Disney characters being Mickey Mouse, Donald Duck, Goofy and Pluto. The park also had its own mascots being an anthropomorphic father bear and a little bear.
