= MV Angeln =

History
- Name: Angeln (2004-2005) APL Acajutla (2005-2008) Angeln (2008-2010)
- Owner: Brise Bereederungs GmbH & Co. KG
- Operator: Bernuth Line
- Port of registry: (Antigua and Barbuda) Saint John's
- Route: Trinidad - Saint Lucia - Barbados - Suriname - Guyana - Trinidad
- Builder: Zhousan, China
- Launched: 14 October 2003
- Identification: IMO number: 9298600; MMSI number: 304618000; Callsign: V2BU2
- Fate: Sank 21 February 2010

General characteristics
- Class & type: Container ship
- Tonnage: 6,704 GT; 3,557 NT
- Length: 132.57 m (434 ft 11 in) overall; 123.40 m (404 ft 10 in) between perpendiculars
- Beam: 19.20 m (63 ft 0 in)
- Height: 33.20 m (108 ft 11 in) (in ballast); 31.90 m (104 ft 8 in) (laden)
- Draught: 7.22 m (23 ft 8 in) (summer)
- Depth: 9.20 m (30 ft 2 in)
- Propulsion: MAK 7 M 43 diesel engine
- Speed: 17.5 knots (32.4 km/h)
- Capacity: 657 TEU
- Crew: 15
- Notes: Fitted with two 50t capacity cranes

Angeln was a container ship which was built at Zhoushan Shipyard in 2004. She capsized and sank off Saint Lucia in February 2010.

== Description ==
Angeln was built by Zhoushan Shipyard, China in 2004. She was 132.57 metres (434 ft 11 in) overall and 123.40 metres (404 ft 10 in) between perpendiculars, with a beam of 19.20 metres (63 ft 0 in). She had a draught of 7.22 metres (23 ft 8 in), and an air draught of 33.20 metres (108 ft 11 in) when in ballast or 31.90 metres (104 ft 8 in) when laden. Her depth was 9.20 metres (30 ft 2 in). Angeln was powered by a MAK 7 M 43 diesel engine of 6,300 kilowatts (8,400 hp) which could propel her at 17.5 knots (32.4 km/h).

== History ==
Angeln was owned by Brise Bereederungs GmbH & Co. KG, Hamburg, Germany. She was chartered by Bernuth Lines, Miami, Florida. She was allocated IMO Number 9298600. MMSI Number 304618000 and used the callsign V2BU2. In 2009, she was drydocked for examination by Germanischer Lloyd

== Sinking ==
On 21 February 2010, Angeln departed Vieux Fort, Saint Lucia at about 21:00 local time (01:00 on 22 February UTC) bound for Barbados. She developed a list which rapidly increased. The order was given to abandon ship, which all 15 crew did successfully. Between 21:30 and 22:00, the ship capsized and sank. A salvage agreement was made with Titan Salvage under Lloyd's Open Form rules, but it was later decided that the ship was a constructive total loss. Titan were then awarded another contract to remove pollutants from the wreck. This work commenced on 4 March 2010, and completed on 21 April. The wreck has been designated a protected site by the Saint Lucia Air and Sea Ports Authority, who have issued a Wreck Removal Order.
