= Okpo-dong =

Neighborhood in Geoje, South Korea

Coordinates: 34°53′17″N 128°41′37″E

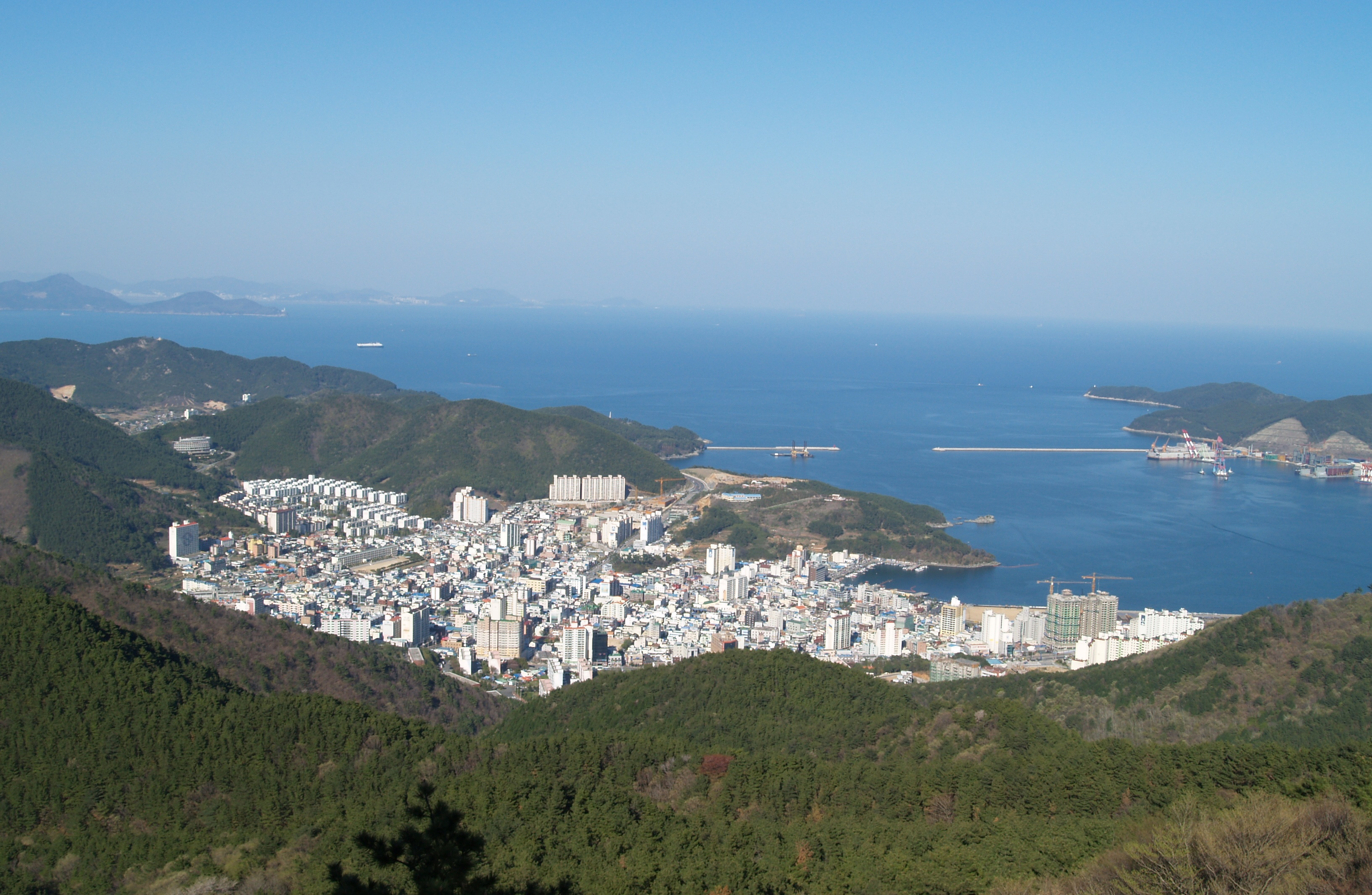
- View of Okpo-dong

Korean name
- Hangul: 옥포동
- Hanja: 玉浦洞
- RR: Okpo-dong
- MR: Okp'o-dong

Okpo-dong (Korean: 옥포동) is a neighborhood in the city of Geoje in South Gyeongsang Province, South Korea. The village is located on the eastern coast of Geoje Island and a center of the island.

The Hanwha Ocean shipyard is located close to the town. A large portion of shipyard employees live in Okpo.

There are very few standalone houses in Okpo and most residential accommodation is fulfilled by high-rise apartments. Rent is high. There are a number of local accommodation agencies offering apartments for rent to incoming foreigners, as well as other supporting services.

Okpo has a large foreign transient population due to the shipyards. As a result, there is a 'Foreigner's Club' by the Admiral Hotel which is run by the local expat residents themselves. There are also over fifty Western bars and two dozen Western restaurants serving a variety of 'Western style' meals. There are also Indian, Pakistani, Vietnamese and Turkish restaurants.

From Busan airport, the journey time by taxi, by way of the Geoje-Busan Bridge (10,000KRW toll each way), is under 1 hour, although heavy weekend traffic can be up to 90 minutes.

There is an international school called the Atherton International School (AIS).

Okpo once had an amusement park, Okpo Land, on the outskirts of the city. It went out of business in 1999, but because the land has been zoned for environmentally low-impact projects, it remained abandoned until 2011, when it was finally demolished.

== History ==
This is the region where Okpo Bay is located, the setting for the Battle of Okpo, which took place on June 16, 1592, during the Imjin War, which is Japanese invasions of Korea (1592–98), where Admiral Yi Sun-sin led the Joseon navy to achieve its first victory.
