= Hamburg Süd =

German shipping company

Hamburg Süd A/S
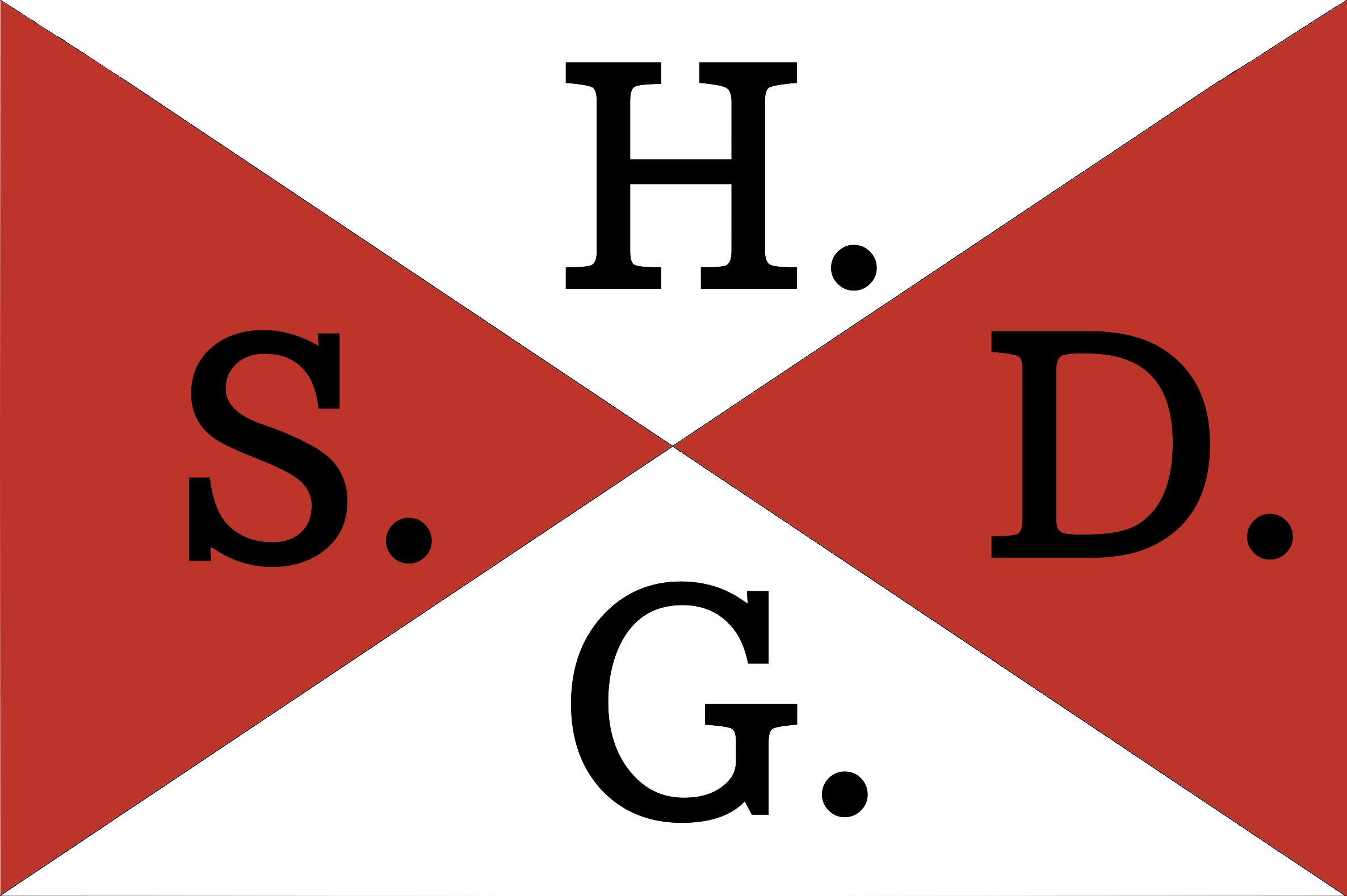
- House flag

- Company type: A/S
- Industry: Transport
- Founded: 1871
- Defunct: 2023
- Fate: Sold to Maersk
- Headquarters: Hamburg, Germany
- Key people: Poul Hestbaek (CEO)
- Products: Container shipping Freight distribution Supply chain management
- Revenue: Turnover 5,637 (2016)
- Number of employees: 6,301 (2016)
- Parent: Maersk Line

Hamburg Südamerikanische Dampfschifffahrts-Gesellschaft A/S & Co KG, widely known as Hamburg Süd, was a German container shipping company. Founded in 1871, Hamburg Süd was among the market leaders in the North–South trade. It also served all significant East–West trade lanes.

The shipping entity was formerly part of the Oetker Group, but was sold to Maersk Line in 2017.

In 2023, the Mark Livery and the red colour were phased out in favour of the Maersk brand.

== History ==
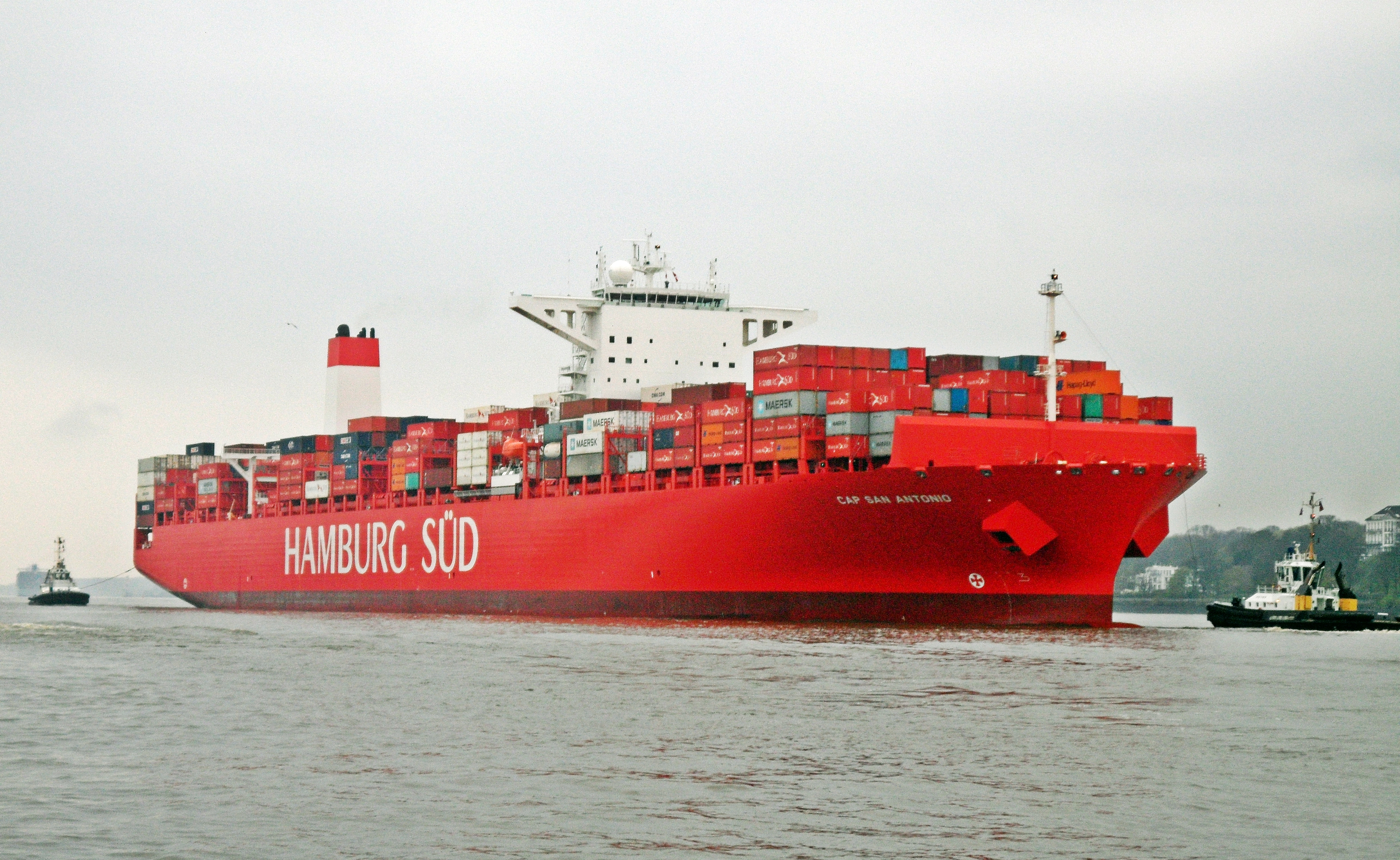
Cap San Antonio

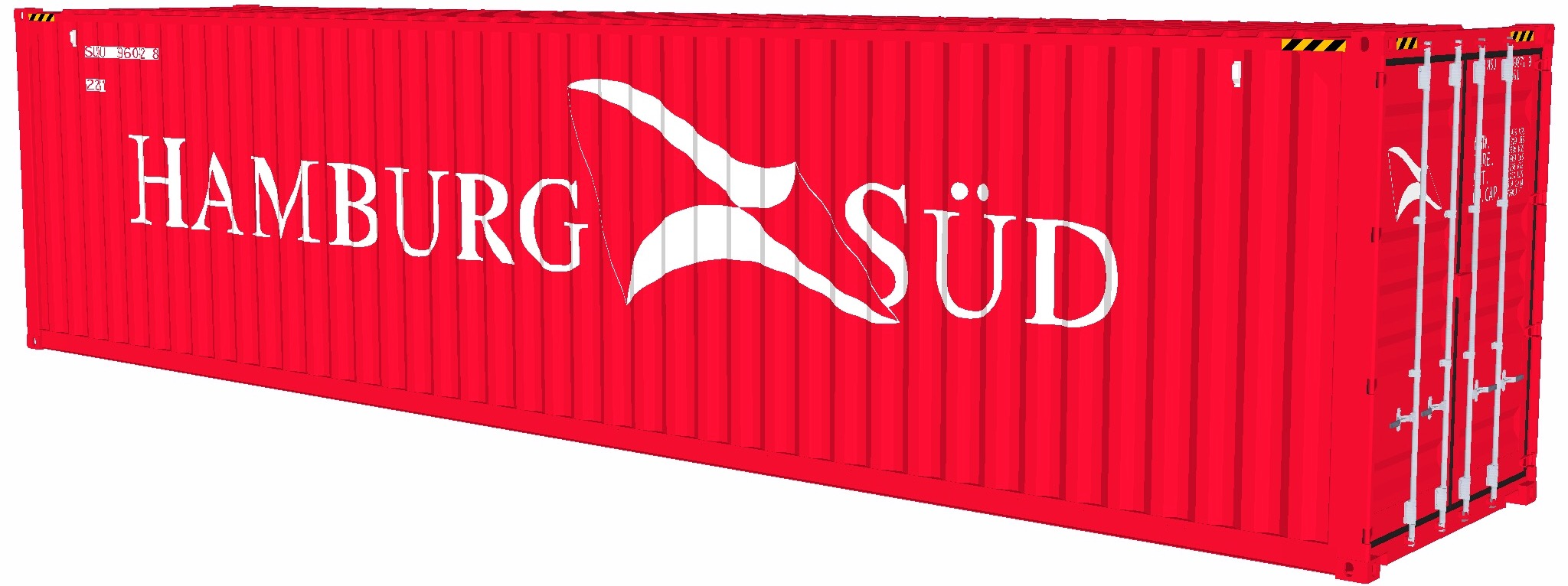
A Hamburg Süd 40ft container

In 1871, Hamburg Südamerikanische Dampfschifffahrts-Gesellschaft (Hamburg–South America Steam Shipping Company, or Hamburg South America Line) was established by a conglomerate of 11 Hamburg-based merchant houses. Three steam-ships totalling 4,000 GRT provided a monthly shipping service to Brazil and Argentina.

By 1914, the company was operating over 50 ships, totaling about 325,000 GRT. World War I culminated in the loss of all Hamburg Süd's ships, and the company was forced to begin again by chartering ships.

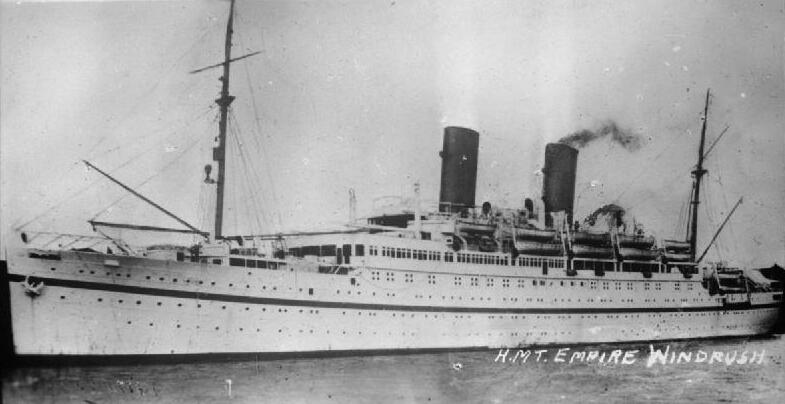
Empire Windrush, known for the Windrush Generation, was Hamburg Süd's Monte Rosa.

The early 1950s saw the company embark on tramp shipping and tanker shipping, and caused the large growth of refrigerated cargo. In 1955, the Dr. August Oetker company took over the entity, and began rapid expansion on its liner and passenger services.

The takeover of Deutsche Levante Linie in 1956 saw the company commence its first foray into the Mediterranean. In 1957, liner services began between North America and Australia/New Zealand, with the Columbus New Zealand being the first container ship to ply trade lanes in the region in 1971, pioneering containerization in the Pacific.

== Wartime roles ==
Cap Trafalgar was a brand-new passenger liner, having been completed only on March 1, 1914 and had commenced her maiden voyage only on March 10, 1914. Germany had lightly armed the ship with two 10.5 cm guns and six heavy machine guns, and had removed one of her three funnels and re-painted the ship to disguise it as a British liner. She encountered the more heavily armed Royal Navy armed merchant cruiser HMS Carmania, which also was a converted passenger liner, about 700 miles east of the Brazilian coast, near the island of Trindade, at 9:30 a.m. on September 14, 1914. After a heated exchange of fire between the two ships, Cap Trafalgar began listing to port, then sank bow-first.

Cap Arcona was converted to serve the Kriegsmarine (German Navy) as a transport ship in 1940. At the end of 1944 she was commandeered as a troopship, primarily transporting refugees and prisoners of war on the Baltic Sea. Loaded with 4,500 prisoners at Lübeck Bay, she was attacked and sunk by Royal Air Force Typhoons in an air-raid. It remained capsized in Lübeck Bay until 1950 and was then dismantled by divers over a period of several years and scrapped. The wreckage was registered and photographed in detail by Rolls-Royce, which had produced the RAF's rockets, to assess their effectiveness.

== Corporate takeovers ==
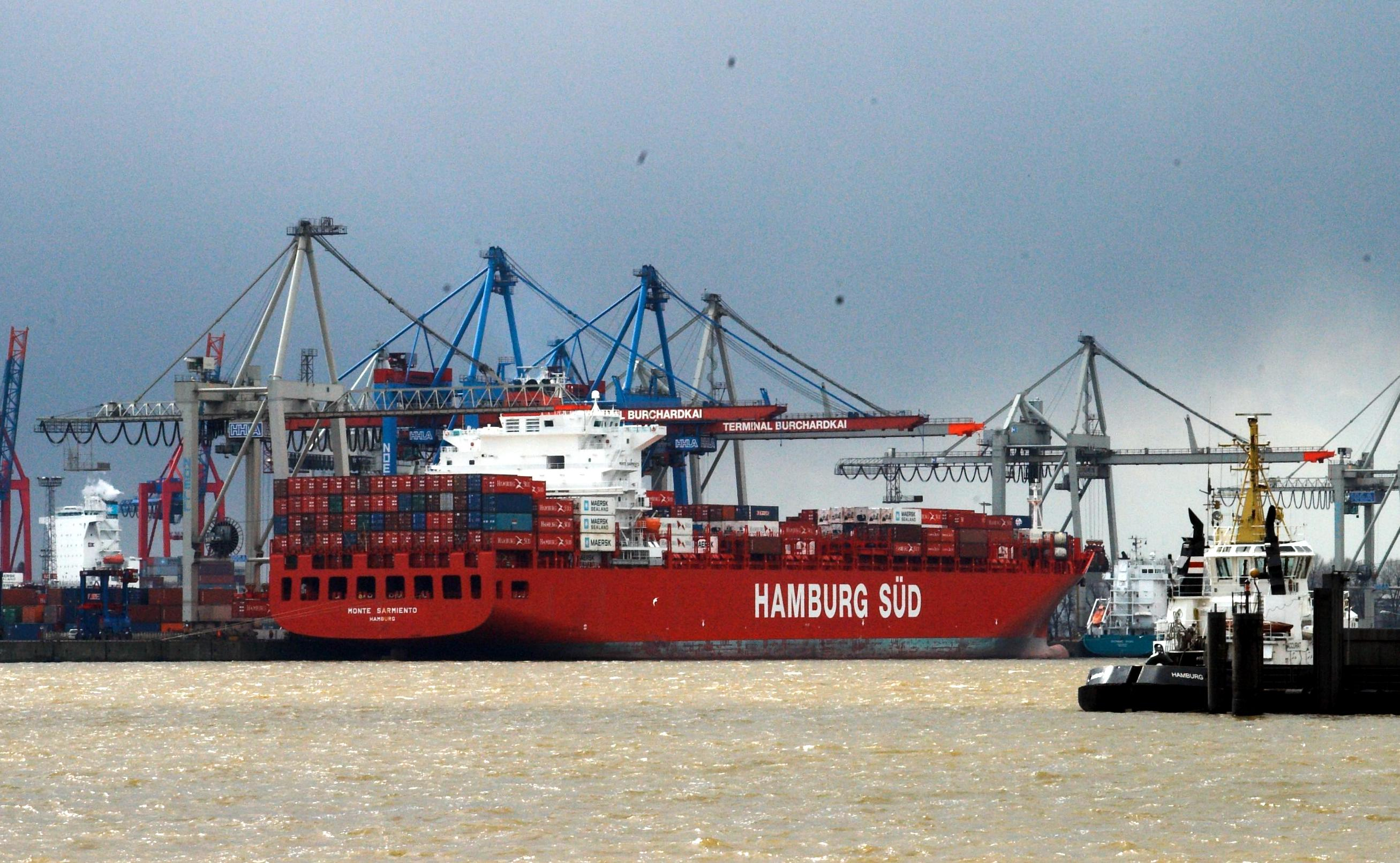
Container ship Monte Sarmiento

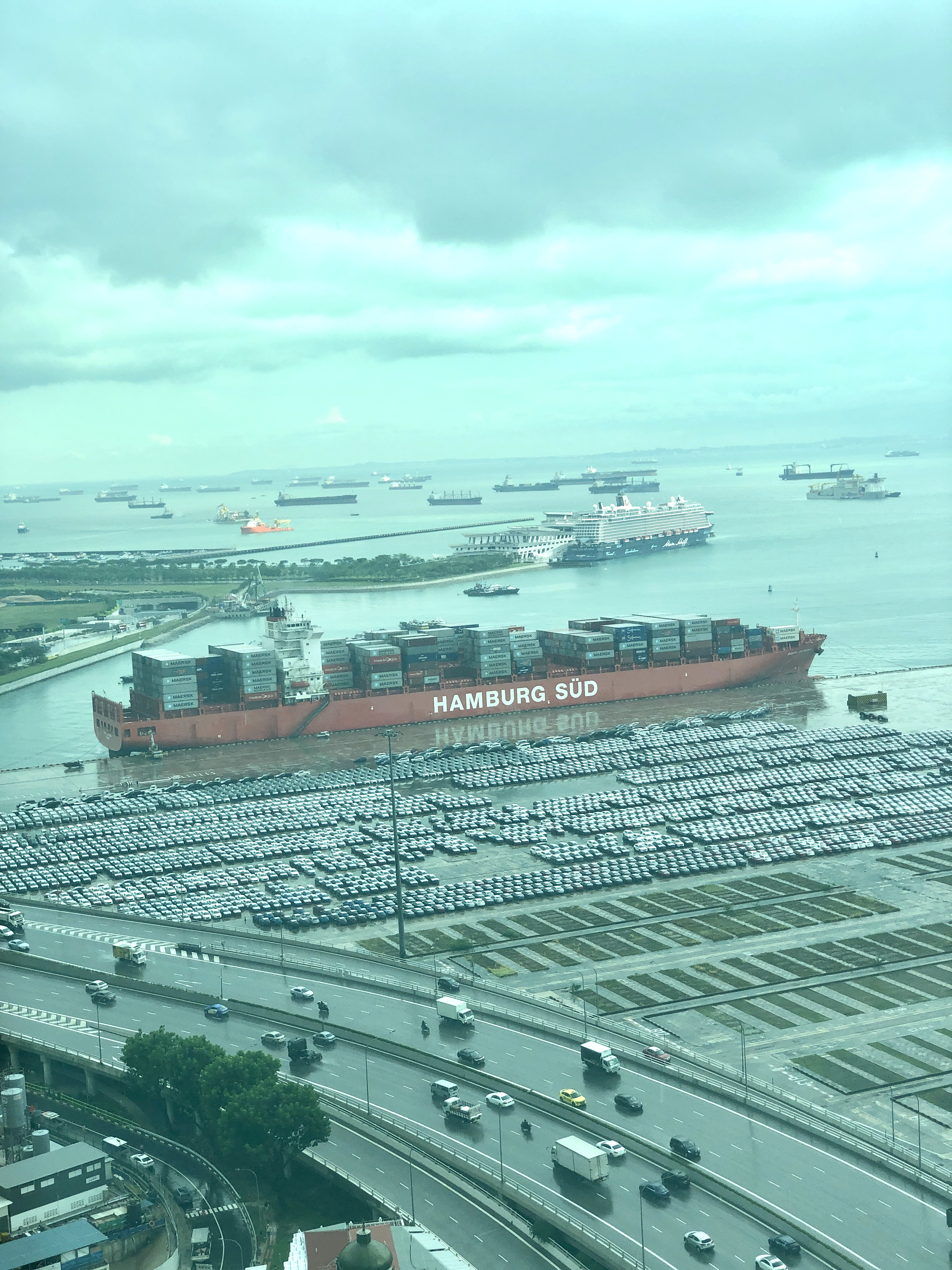
Hamburg Süd container ship in Singapore

Hamburg Süd also owned Brazilian operator Aliança. It has taken over many companies over the years including Ellerman, Kien Hung, South Seas Steamship, Deutsche-Nah-Ost-Linie, Royal Mail Line, Pacific Steam Navigation Company, Swedish Laser Lines, Rotterdam Zuid-America Lijn (RZAL), Havenlijn and the Inter-America services of Crowley American Transport, and in 2015 the Chilean CCNI.

In the past parts of Hamburg Süd have been known as Columbus Line. Since 2004, the services of Columbus Line are directly integrated into Hamburg-Süd.

The current container fleet of dry boxes has a distinctive red color with a huge flag and white HAMBURG SÜD logo on the side. The refrigerated boxes are white with the flag and navy blue lettering.

Hamburg Sud bought 25.000 containers and the CCL trade mark of the Italian Genoise Shipping Company CCL - Costa Container Line, based in Genoa Port, on 1st December 2007.

In 2023, Maersk announced the brand would be retired.

== Humanitarian aid ==
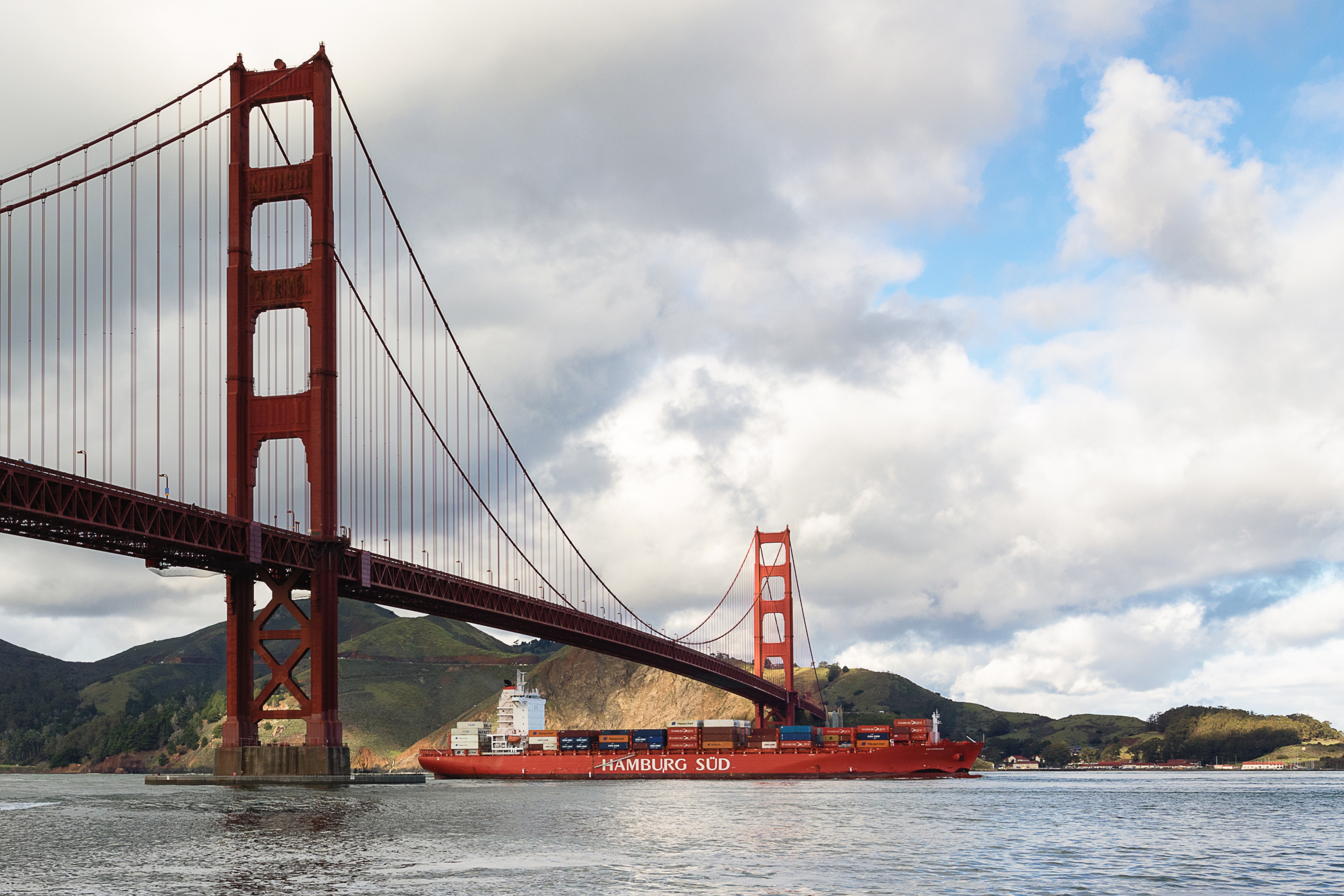
One of Hamburg Süd's container ships passing the Golden Gate

Hamburg Süd supports international aid organisations with in-house shipping facilities. In the shortest possible time, relief supplies and technical or medical equipment are transported where needed, typically after natural disasters such as hurricanes, earthquakes, and volcanic eruptions.

Hamburg Süd maintains a long-term relationship to SOS Children's Villages, supporting their projects in different countries. Hamburg Süd also supports various initiatives in the fields of education and culture, including the United Buddy Bears exhibitions.

== External links and references ==
- Official site
- Rudolf A. Oetker KG official site
- Aliança official Site
- Documents and clippings about Hamburg Süd in the 20th Century Press Archives of the ZBW
