= George Clayton =

George Clayton may refer to:

- George Clayton (writer), a writer who wrote a book about angels
- George W. Clayton, a businessman and philanthropist in Denver, Colorado
- George Clayton Johnson, an American science fiction writer
- Christopher Clayton (businessman) (George Christopher Clayton, 1869–1945), British scientist, industrialist and politician
- George Clayton (courtier), see Michael Bowes-Lyon, 18th Earl of Strathmore and Kinghorne
- George Clayton (minister), see Alfred Sturge
