= Clayton College =

Clayton College may refer to:

- Clayton State University (formerly Clayton College and State University), an American public university in Morrow, Georgia, and part of the University System of Georgia
- Clayton College of Natural Health, a defunct non-accredited American college based in Birmingham, Alabama
- Clayton School for Boys in Denver, Colorado, a facility for orphaned boys established by George Washington Clayton
