= Park Hill Park =

Park in Denver, Colorado

Coordinates: 39°46′16.23″N 104°56′14.73″W

Park Hill Park is located in Denver, Colorado, United States, on the site of the former Park Hill Golf Club, an 18-hole golf course that operated from 1930 until 2018. The land is bordered by Colorado Blvd, 35th Ave, Dahlia St, and 40th Ave.

In January 2025, the mayor of Denver announced that the city acquired the golf course in a land swap. The land became the fourth-largest city park operated by Denver. As of January 2025, the city intends to open a park in summer 2025 with an immediate short-term use as open space. Interim use and long-term use of the park will be determined with public input.

== History ==
The land was originally owned by George W. Clayton, a Denver businessman and philanthropist, and he operated it as a dairy farm. Clayton left his entire estate in a trust which stipulated the creation of a school for boys. The trustees included the City of Denver. The Clayton School for Boys opened in 1911 across Colorado Boulevard from the property. Up until 1930, the Clayton College Dairy Farm continued to operate and was used to teach agricultural skills to the boys attending the school.

In 1930, the trust signed an operating license for a private golf club to receive income from the property. Over the years, alternate uses were considered. The City of Denver considered the golf course as a possible site for the Auraria Campus in 1969 and as a new home for the Denver Mint in 1974. In the 1980s, a complaint against the City of Denver for mismanaging the trust led to the formation of the Clayton Foundation.

In 1986, the Clayton Foundation put the property on the market but was unable to sell the land, likely due to the oil and gas bust of the 1980s. Instead, in 1997, Mayor Wellington Webb made a deal with the foundation to place a conservation easement on the land to limit its use to a golf course and open space.

Denver announced in 2016 the need for a major drainage improvement between Platte and Park Hill. The project would require a substantial portion of the northeast side of golf course. By 2017, the trustees were again considering alternate uses for the land because the golf course lease was set to end in 2018 and the trust had seen declining revenue. Denver made an offer to purchase the land for $20.5 million, but they were not able to complete the deal.

In 2018, the golf club closed. The most recent operator of the golf course, Arcis Golf, filed suit against the city over the impacts of the drainage work. In 2019, the Clayton Foundation sold the property to developer Westside Investment Partners for $24 million. the developer took over the lawsuit filed by Arcis Golf. Westside's development plans sparked opposition from groups like Save Open Space Denver, who argued that the conservation easement should prevent further development. Following a series of community conversations, legal battles, and city council decisions, voters rejected Westside's proposal to redevelop the site into housing, retail, and park space in April 2023 in the hopes of creating Denver's fourth-largest park. In January 2025, the disputes were resolved when the city acquired the golf course in a land swap. The land became the fourth-largest city park operated by Denver.

== Golf course ==
Park Hill Golf Club
Club information
- Established: 1931
- Operator: Arcis Golf
- Website: parkhillgc.com

Park Hill Golf Course
- Designed by: Clark Hamilton
- Par: 71
- Length: 6592
- Course rating: 69.2

The Clark Hamilton-designed course was established in 1931. The course closed in 2018.

The course was established in 1930 by Robert Shearer, who operated the course until 1970. The course hosted various charity tournaments and a Park Hill Invitational from 1936 to 1957 that featured celebrities like Bing Crosby, Joe Louis, Bob Hope, President Dwight Eisenhower, and Arnold Palmer. The course was largely whites-only through its first few decades, and its segregationist policies incited headlines and protests.
