= Angel =

Supernatural being in religions and mythologies

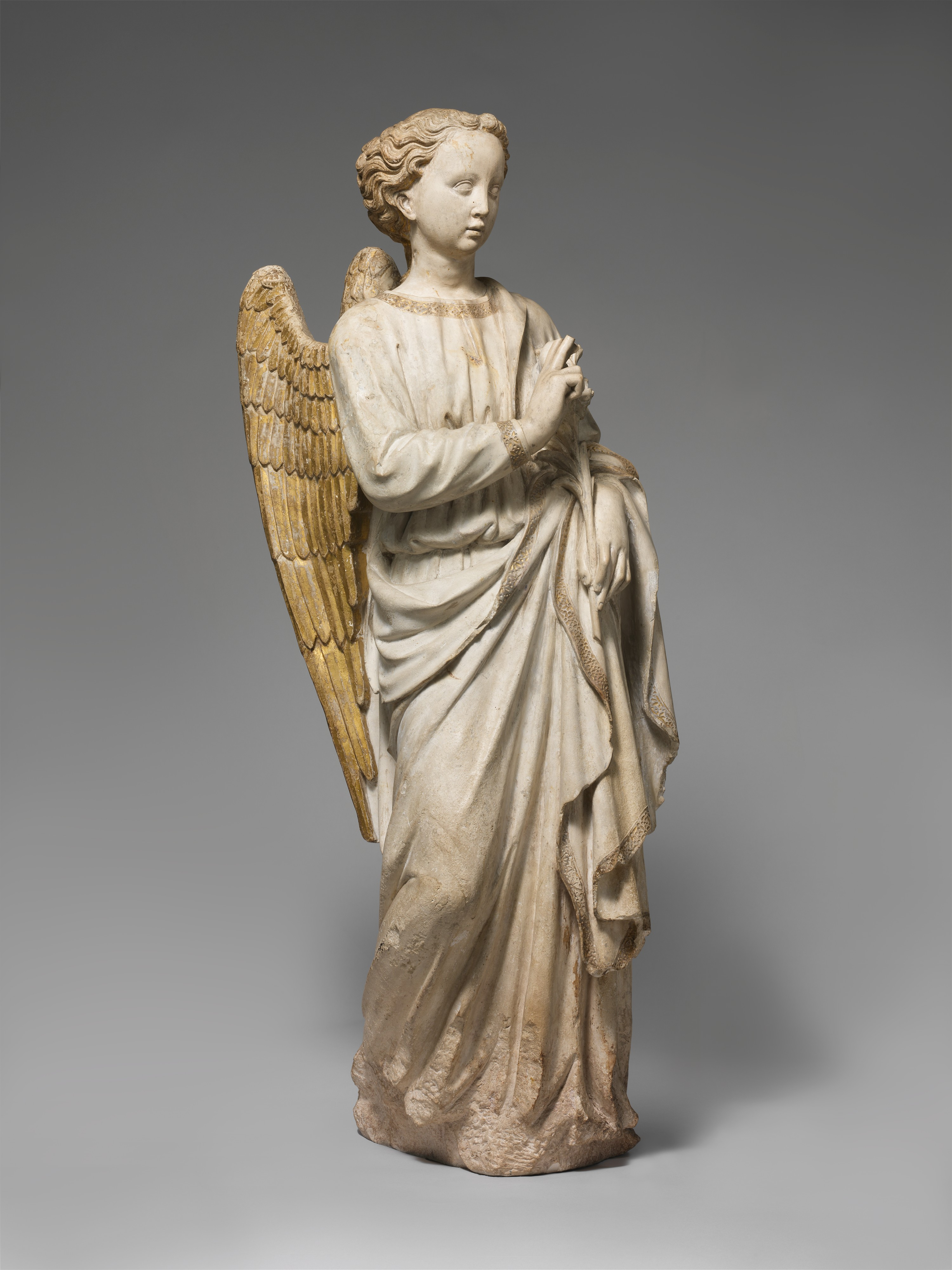
Statue of the angel of the Annunciation, c. 1430–1440, Metropolitan Museum of Art

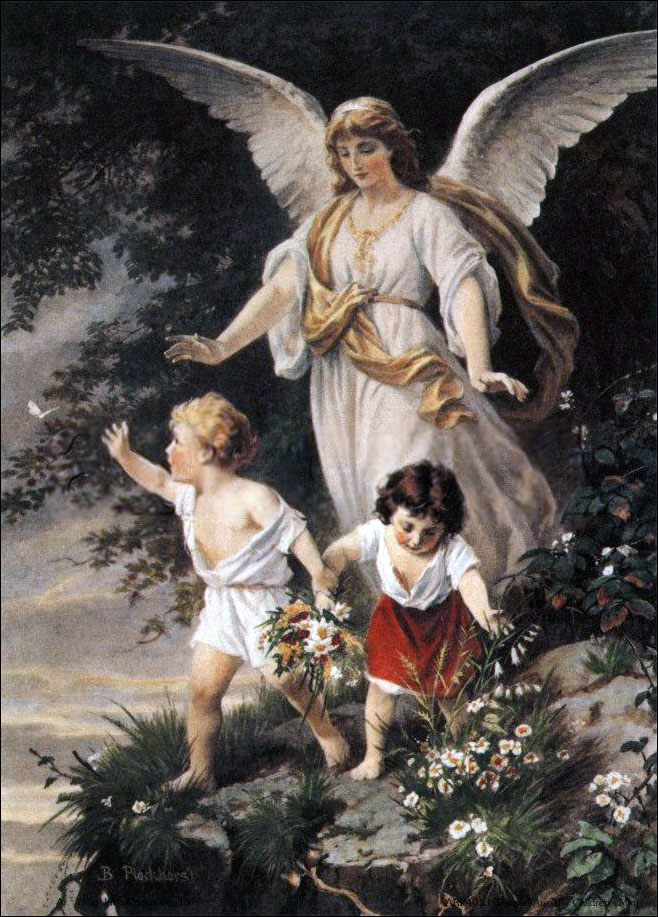
Schutzengel ("Guardian angel") by Bernhard Plockhorst depicts a guardian angel watching over two children.

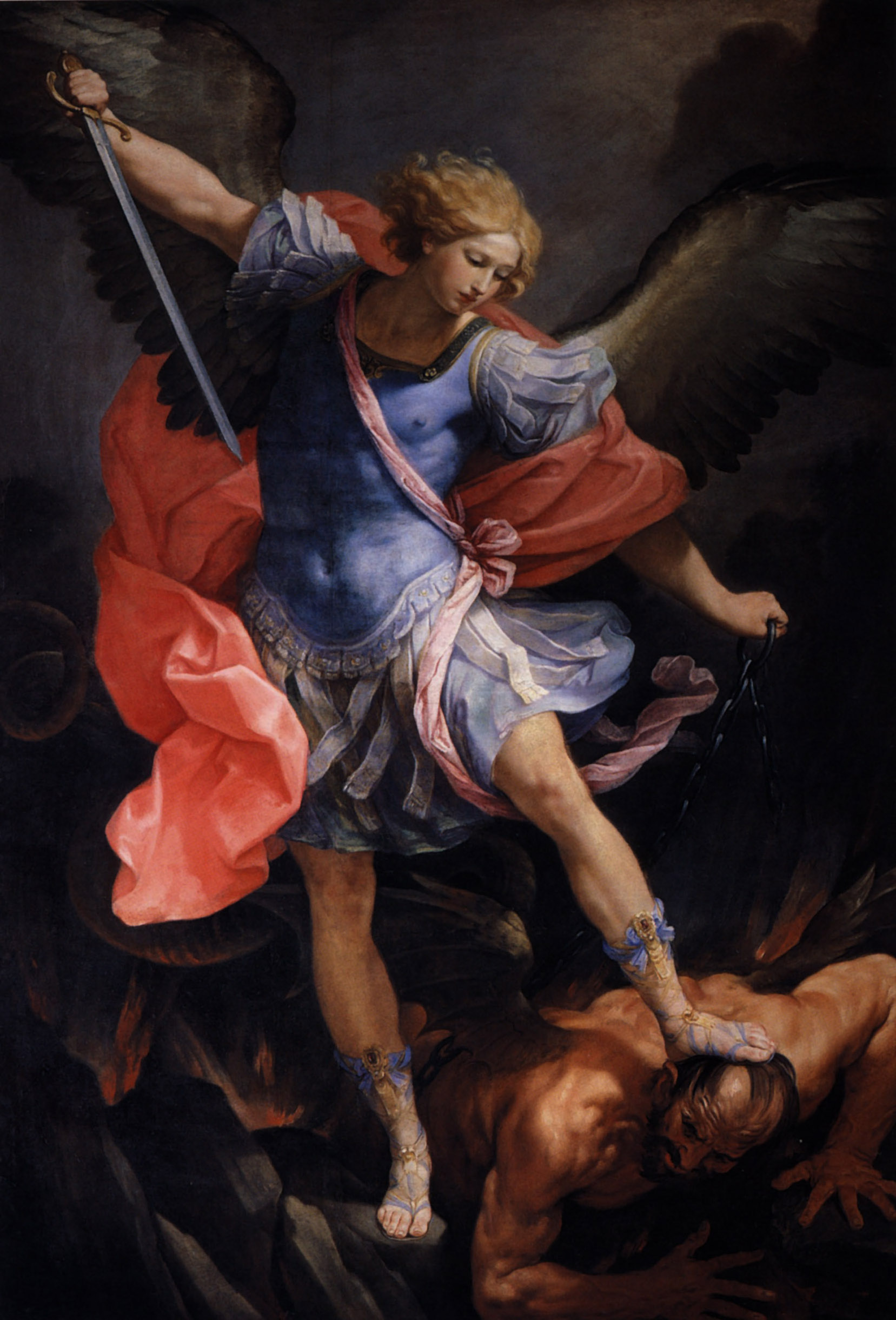
The Archangel Michael.

An angel is a spiritual, heavenly, or supernatural entity, often depicted as humanoid with bird-like wings, frequently in the role as a messenger or intermediary between God (the transcendent) and humanity (the profane) in various traditions like the Abrahamic religions. Other roles include protectors and guides for humans, such as guardian angels, and servants of God. In Western belief-systems the term is often used to distinguish benevolent from malevolent intermediary beings.

Emphasizing the distance between God and mankind, revelation-based belief-systems require angels to bridge the gap between the earthly and the transcendent realm. Angels play a lesser role in monistic belief-systems, since the gap is non-existent. However, angelic beings might be conceived as aids to achieve a proper relationship with the divine.

Abrahamic religions describe angelic hierarchies, which vary by religion and sect. Some angels are indicated with names (such as Gabriel or Michael) or are of a specific kind or rank (such as a seraph or an archangel). Malevolent angels are often believed to have been expelled from heaven and are called fallen angels. In many such religions, the devil (or devils) is identified with such angels.

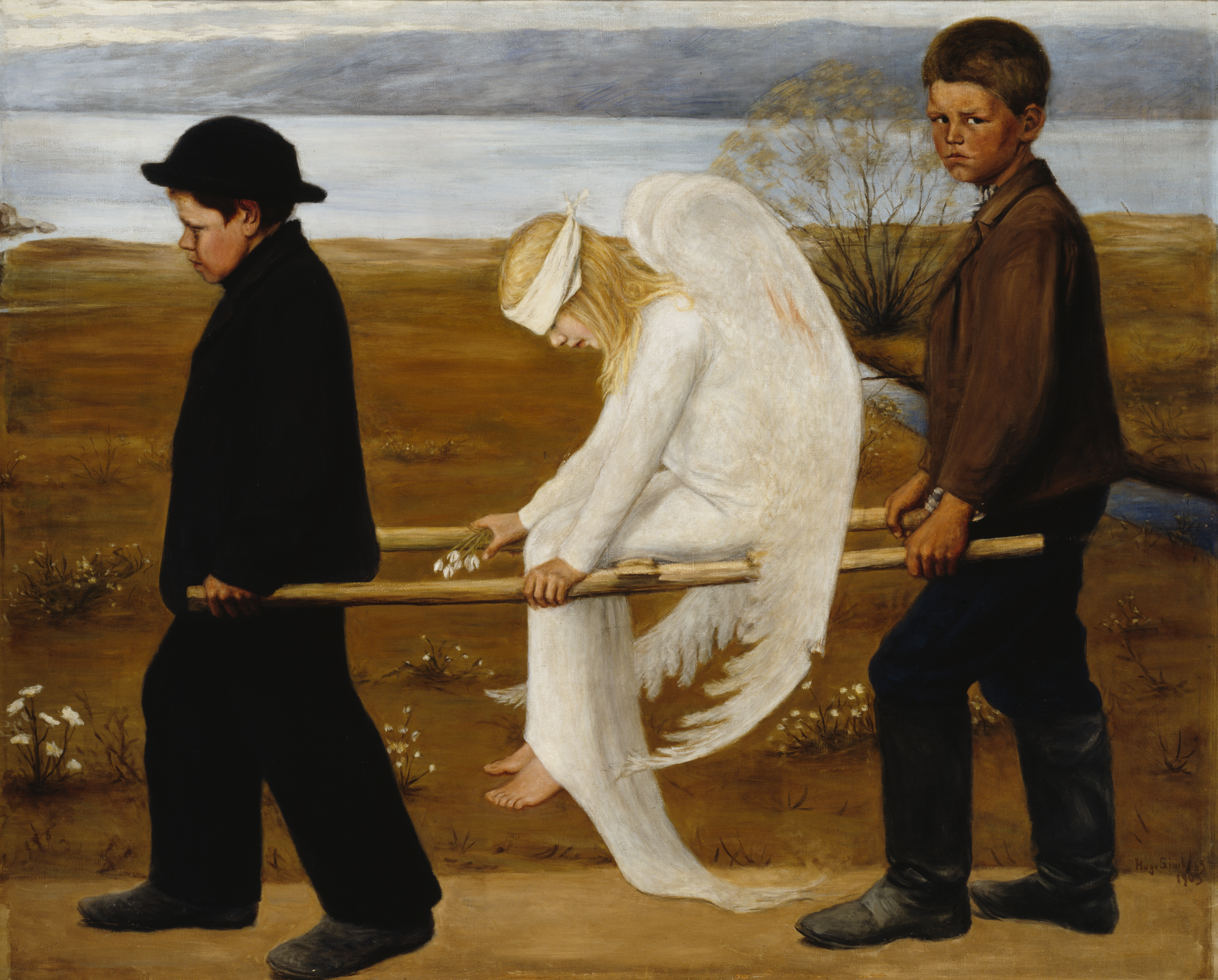
The Wounded Angel, Hugo Simberg, 1903, voted Finland's "national painting" in 2006

Angels in art are often identified with bird wings, halos, and divine light. They are usually shaped like humans of extraordinary beauty, though this is not always the case – sometimes, they are portrayed as being frightening or inhuman.

== Etymology, names ==
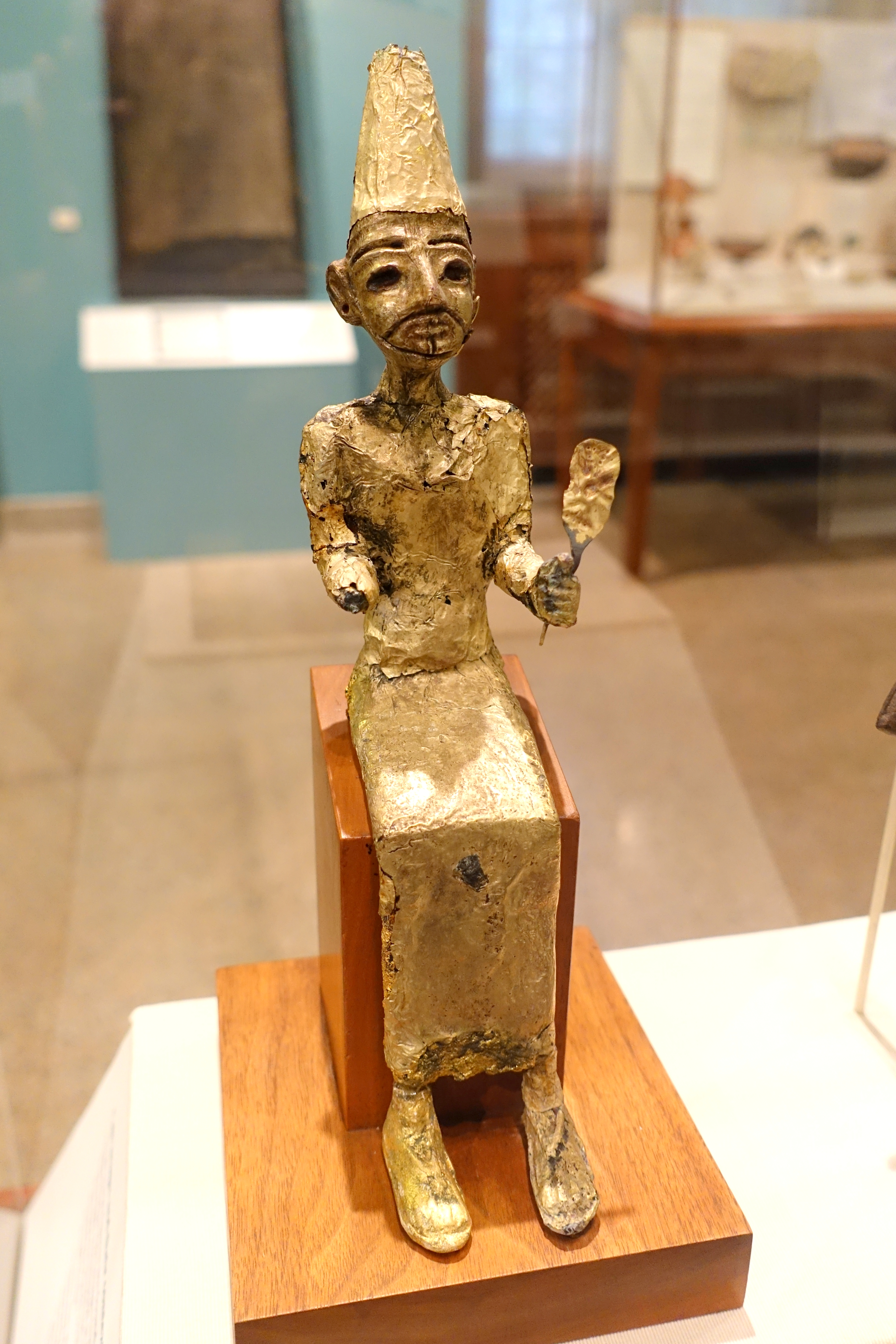
Gilded statue of El (c. 1400–1200 BC) from the site of Tel Megiddo. El is considered to be the cognate of the word "Ilah" and continues to appear in compound angelic names like Gabriel, Michael, Azrael, Raphael and others.

The word angel arrives in modern English from Old English engel (with a hard g) and the Old French angele. Both of these derive from Late Latin angelus, which in turn was borrowed from Late Greek ἄγγελος angelos (literally "messenger"). Τhe word's earliest form is Mycenaean a-ke-ro, attested in Linear B syllabic script. According to the Dutch linguist R. S. P. Beekes, ángelos itself may be "an Oriental loan, like ἄγγαρος (ángaros, 'Persian mounted courier')."

The rendering of ángelos is the Septuagint's default translation of the Biblical Hebrew term malʼākh, denoting simply "messenger" without connoting its nature. In the Latin Vulgate, this meaning becomes bifurcated: when malʼākh or ángelos is supposed to denote a human messenger, words like nuntius or legatus are applied. If the word refers to some supernatural being, the word angelus appears. Such differentiation has been taken over by later vernacular translations of the Bible, early Christian and Jewish exegetes and eventually modern scholars.

== Background ==
The concept of angels is historically best to be understood from different ideas of the concept of God throughout history. In polytheistic and animistic worldviews, supernatural powers (i.e. deities, spirits, daemons, etc.) were assigned to different natural phenomena. Within a monotheistic framework, these powers were reconsidered to be servants of the supreme deity, turning autonomous supernatural beings into "angels".

By that, supernatural powers controlling or influencing humanity's perception of the world, including natural phenomena and humans, are ultimately under control of a supreme God. Prominent angels, such as Michael and Gabriel, reflect a connection to the Chief Semitic deity El. Even "bad" angels such as Satan, Samael, Iblis etc., can be understood as an operating force within the nature of humans, as responsible for selfish tendencies.

The idea of angels in early Hebrew scripture as supernatural agents is absent. Instead, the Hebrew deity intervenes in human affairs, mostly by means of punishment. Only in later thought of post-exilic and prophetic writings, the Biblical deity is conceptualized as distant and more merciful, his interventions replaced by the idea of angels. However, such angels still carry out the gruesome attributes of God and can be both benevolent and malevolent. The notion of angels as embodiment of good emerges only under influence of Zoroastrianism, in which the Devil is conceived as the principle of evil, with a hosts of demons, in battle with the holy entities (Aməša Spəṇta) created by Ahura Mazda (principle of good).

The influence of dualistic tendencies and replacement of divine powers by angels is evident in the Qumram writings. In the Angelic Liturgy, the Hebrew term elim (deities, heavenly powers) is used for angelic beings and not for God. The War Scroll speaks about angels of light fighting against demonic beings of darkness.

== Zoroastrianism ==
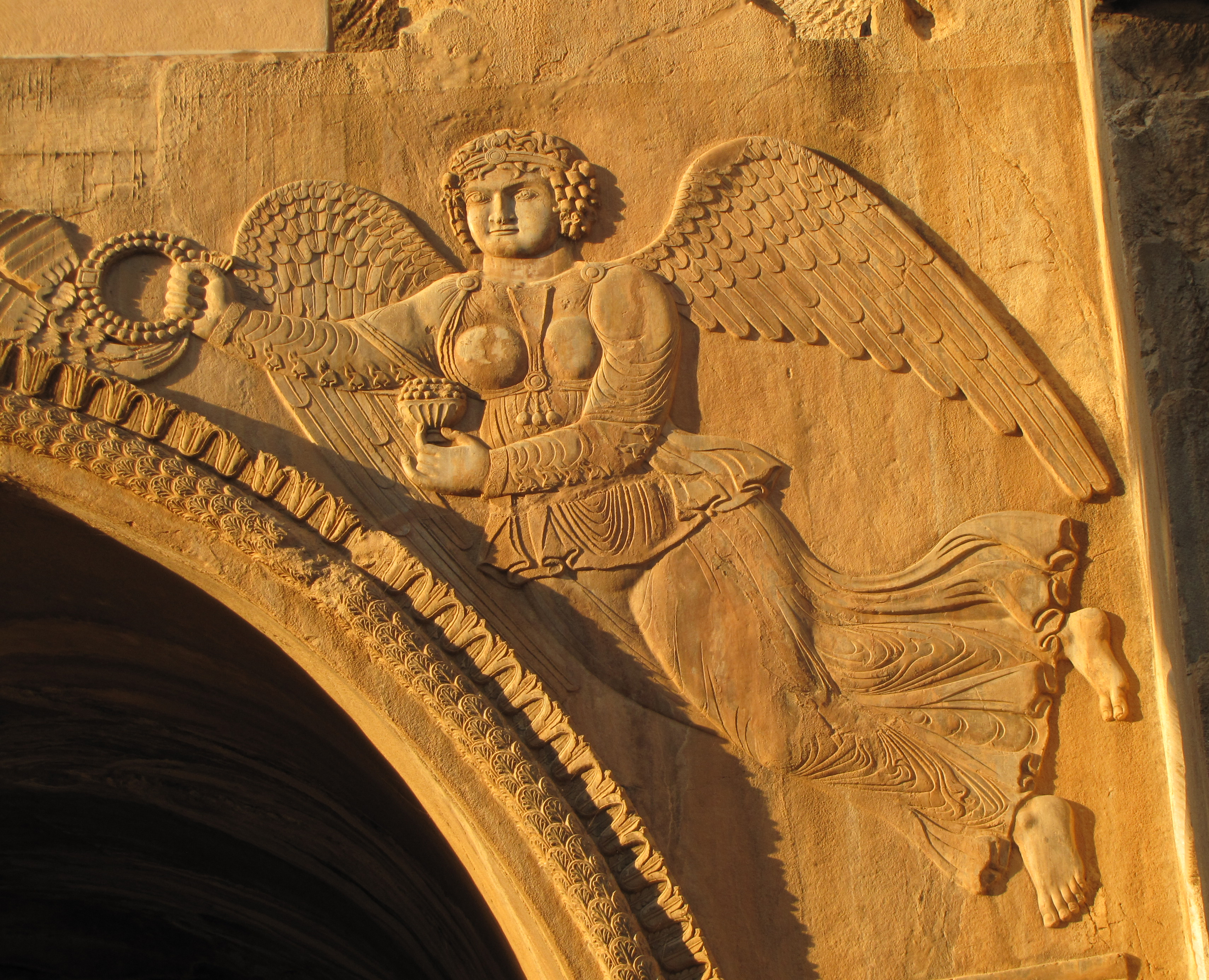
Relief of Angel, Taq-e Bostan

In Zoroastrianism there are different angel-like figures. They patronize human beings and other creatures, and also manifest God's energy.

The Amesha Spentas, although rather emanations of Ahura Mazda ("Wise Lord", God) than distinct messengers, have often been compared to angels. Similar to angels in Abrahamic tradition, Vohu Manah reveals to Zoroaster the true nature of God.

Additionally to the Amesha Spentas, the Fravashi have often been compared to angels, functioning as a guardian angel, and have been adopted as such by Zoroastrians themselves since the 19th century. Unlike the Amesha Spentas, the Fravashi appear as individualized warriors of Ahura Mazda's celestial army, descending from heaven to aid those who summon them against demons.

== Judaism ==
In Judaism, angels (Hebrew: מַלְאָךְ mal'āḵ; "messenger"), are understood through interpretation of the Tanakh and in a long tradition as supernatural beings who stand by God in heaven, but are strictly to be distinguished from God and are subordinate to him. Occasionally, they can show selected people God's will and instructions. In the Jewish tradition they are also inferior to humans since they have no will of their own and are able to carry out only one divine command.

=== Hebrew Bible ===
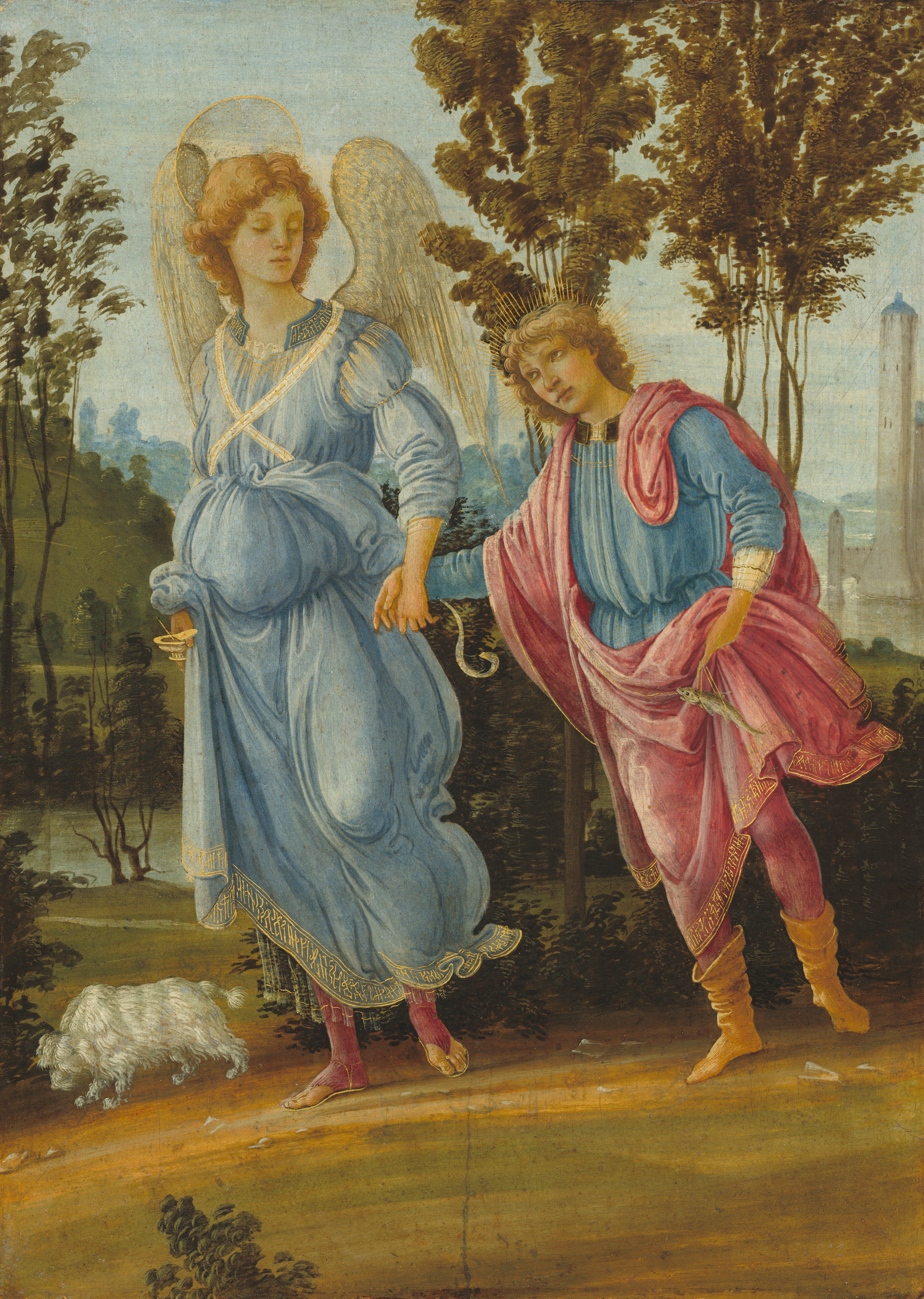
Tobias and the Angel by Filippino Lippi, created between c. 1472 and c. 1482

The Torah uses the Hebrew terms מלאך אלהים (mal'āk̠ 'ĕlōhîm; "messenger of God"), מלאך יהוה (mal'āk̠ Yahweh; "messenger of the Lord"), בני אלהים (bənē 'ĕlōhîm; "sons of God") and הקודשים (haqqôd̠əšîm; "the holy ones") to refer to beings traditionally interpreted as angels.

The term 'מלאך' ('mal'āk̠') is also used in other books of the Hebrew Bible. In the early stages of Hebrew writings, the term refers to human messengers, not to supernatural entities. A human messenger might be a prophet or priest, such as Malachi, "my messenger"; the Greek superscription in the Septuagint translation states the Book of Malachi was written "by the hand of his messenger" ἀγγέλου (angélu). Examples of a supernatural messenger are the "Malak YHWH", who is either a messenger from God, an aspect of God (such as the logos), or God himself as the messenger (the "theophanic angel.")

In the early writings of the Hebrew Bible, both Hebrew: בְנֵי־הָאֱלֹהִים, romanized: Bənē hāʾĔlōhīm, lit. 'Sons of Gods' as well as the Hebrew: מַלְאָךְ, romanized: mal’āḵ, lit. 'messenger' are aspects of God. In the earliest records, the Bənē hāʾĔlōhīm are in heaven. They are depicted as the heavenly court or the pantheon of religious belief-system of their time. They reflect the transcendent aspect of the Divine, but become progressively differentiated from the good aspect of the Divine. The mal’āḵ on the other hand, expresses the Divinties' interaction with the world. As such the mal’āḵ functions as the voice of the Divine, the Divine spirit, or as God himself. In Exodus 3:2–4, it is both Yahweh as well as a mal’āḵ by which Moses is addressed. The fusion of the Bənē hāʾĔlōhīm with the mal’āḵ is evident in the Book of Hiob. Here, Satan is both one of the Bənē hāʾĔlōhīm in the heavenly court, as well as a mal’āḵ expressing God's interaction with humanity.

Michael D. Coogan notes that it is only in the late books that the terms "come to mean the benevolent semi-divine beings familiar from later mythology and art." Daniel is the biblical book to refer to individual angels by name, mentioning Gabriel in Daniel 9:21 and Michael in Daniel 10:13. These angels are part of Daniel's apocalyptic visions and are an important part of apocalyptic literature.

In Daniel 7, Daniel receives a dream-vision from God. [...] As Daniel watches, the Ancient of Days takes his seat on the throne of heaven and sits in judgement in the midst of the heavenly court [...] an [angel] like a son of man approaches the Ancient One in the clouds of heaven and is given everlasting kingship. Jeffrey Burton Russel writes that "the more the banim and the mal'ak were seen as distinct from the God, the more it was possible to thrust upon the evil elements in the divine character that Yahweh had discarded.".

Coogan explains the development of this concept of angels: "In the postexilic period, with the development of explicit monotheism, these divine beings—the 'sons of God' who were members of the Divine Council—were in effect demoted to what are now known as 'angels', understood as beings created by God, but immortal and thus superior to humans." This conception of angels is best understood in contrast to demons and is often thought to be "influenced by the ancient Persian religious tradition of Zoroastrianism, which viewed the world as a battleground between forces of good and forces of evil, between light and darkness." One of these is hāššāṭān, a figure depicted in (among other places) the Book of Job.

=== Rabbinic Judaism ===
Rabbinic Judaism has been an orthodox form of Judaism since the 6th century CE, after the codification of the Babylonian Talmud. In post-Biblical Judaism, certain angels took on particular significance and developed unique personalities and roles. According to Rabbinic Judaism, the angels have no bodies, but are eternally living creatures created out of fire. The Babylonian Talmud reads as "The Torah was not given to ministering angels." (לא נתנה תורה למלאכי השרת) usually understood as a concession to human's imperfection, in contrast to the angels. Thus, they occasionally appear in Midrashim as competition with humans.

The angels as heavenly beings, strictly following the laws of God, become jealous of God's affection for man. Humans, by following the Torah, in prayer, by resisting evil instincts (yetzer hara) and by teshuva, are preferred to the flawless angels. As a result, they are also inferior to humans in the Jewish tradition. In the Midrash, the plural of El (Elohim) used in Genesis in relation to the creation of human beings is explained by the presence of angels: God therefore consulted with the angels, but made the final decision alone. This story serves as an example, teaching that the powerful should also consult with the weak. God's own final decision highlights God's undisputable omnipotence.

Although archangels were believed to rank among the heavenly host, no systematic hierarchy ever developed. Metatron is considered one of the highest of the angels in Merkabah and Kabbalah mysticism and often serves as a scribe; he is briefly mentioned in the Talmud and figures prominently in Merkabah mystical texts. Michael, who serves as a warrior and advocate for Israel (Daniel 10:13), is looked upon particularly fondly. Gabriel is mentioned in the Book of Daniel (Daniel 8:15–17) and briefly in the Talmud, as well as in many Merkabah mystical texts. There is no evidence in Judaism for the worship of angels, but there is evidence for the invocation and sometimes even conjuration of angels.

Philo of Alexandria identifies the angel with the Logos inasmuch as the angel is the immaterial voice of God. The angel is something different from God himself, but is conceived as God's instrument.

Four classes of ministering angels minister and utter praise before the Holy One, blessed be He: the first camp (led by) Michael on His right, the second camp (led by) Gabriel on His left, the third camp (led by) Uriel before Him, and the fourth camp (led by) Raphael behind Him; and the Shekhinah of the Holy One, blessed be He, is in the centre. He is sitting on a throne high and exalted

Bill Rebiger wrote that the naming of angels are a post-exilic phenomenon, and before they are anonymous messengers, protectors and accusers. He also highlighted rabbinical traditions such as Yerushalmi Rosh Hashanah 56d, which states: "Even the names of the angels came up with them from Babylon. At first it is written ‘then one of the seraphim flew to me’ (Isaiah 6:6), and ‘seraphim stood above Him’ (Isaiah 6:2). But from then on it is written ‘the man Gabriel’ (Daniel 9:21), and ‘Michael your prince’ (Daniel 10:21)."

==== Later interpretations ====
According to Kabbalah, there are four worlds and our world is the last world: the world of action (Assiyah). Angels exist in the worlds above as a 'task' of God. They are an extension of God to produce effects in this world. After an angel has completed its task, it ceases to exist. The angel is in effect the task. This is derived from the book of Genesis when Abraham meets with three angels and Lot meets with two. The task of one of the angels was to inform Sara and Abraham of their coming child. The other two were to save Lot and to destroy Sodom and Gomorrah.

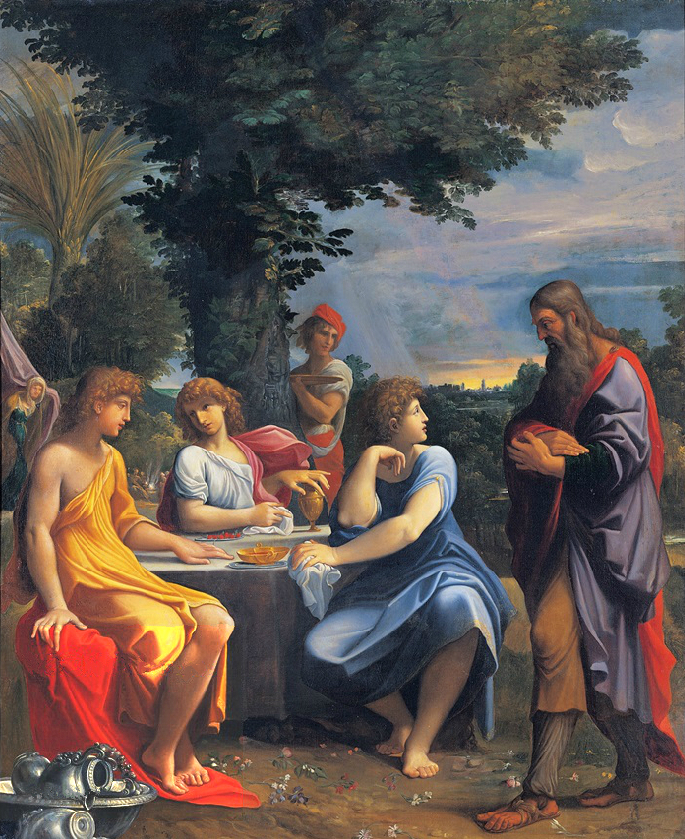
Three angels hosted by Abraham, Ludovico Carracci (c. 1610–1612), Bologna, Pinacoteca Nazionale

Jewish philosopher Maimonides explained his view of angels in his Guide for the Perplexed II:4 and II.

... This leads Aristotle in turn to the demonstrated fact that God, glory and majesty to Him, does not do things by direct contact. God burns things by means of fire; fire is moved by the motion of the sphere; the sphere is moved by means of a disembodied intellect, these intellects being the 'angels which are near to Him', through whose mediation the spheres move ... thus totally disembodied minds exist which emanate from God and are the intermediaries between God and all the bodies [objects] here in this world.

— Guide for the Perplexed II:4, Maimonides

Maimonides had a neo-Aristotelian interpretation of the Bible. Maimonides writes that to the wise man, one sees that what the Bible and Talmud refer to as "angels" are actually allusions to the various laws of nature; they are the principles by which the physical universe operates.

For all forces are angels! How blind, how perniciously blind are the naive?! If you told someone who purports to be a sage of Israel that the Deity sends an angel who enters a woman's womb and there forms an embryo, he would think this a miracle and accept it as a mark of the majesty and power of the Deity, despite the fact that he believes an angel to be a body of fire one third the size of the entire world. All this, he thinks, is possible for God. But if you tell him that God placed in the sperm the power of forming and demarcating these organs, and that this is the angel, or that all forms are produced by the Active Intellect; that here is the angel, the "vice-regent of the world" constantly mentioned by the sages, then he will recoil. – Guide for the Perplexed II:4

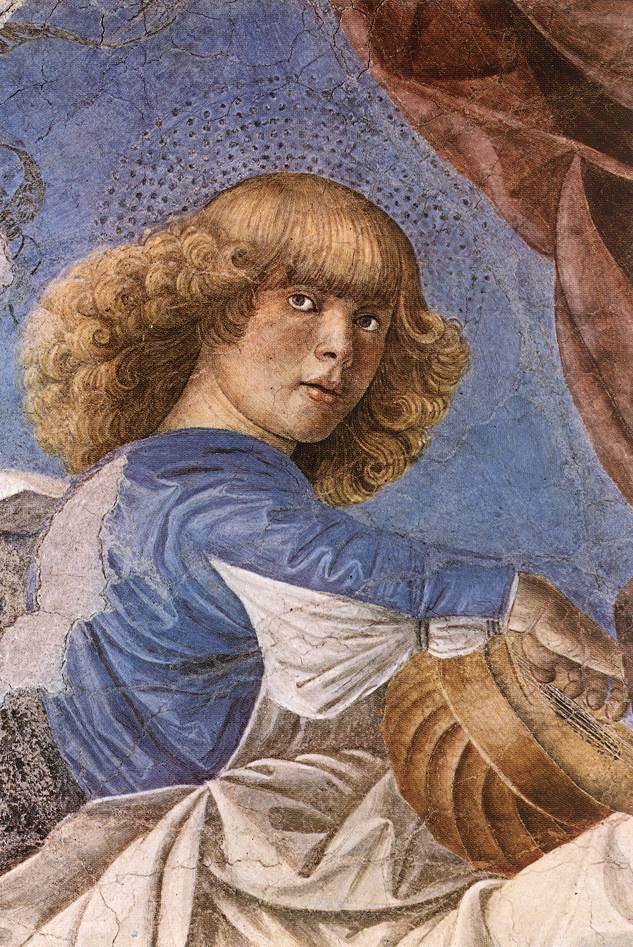
One of Melozzo's musician (seraphim) angels from the Basilica dei Santi Apostoli, now in the sacristy of St. Peter's Basilica

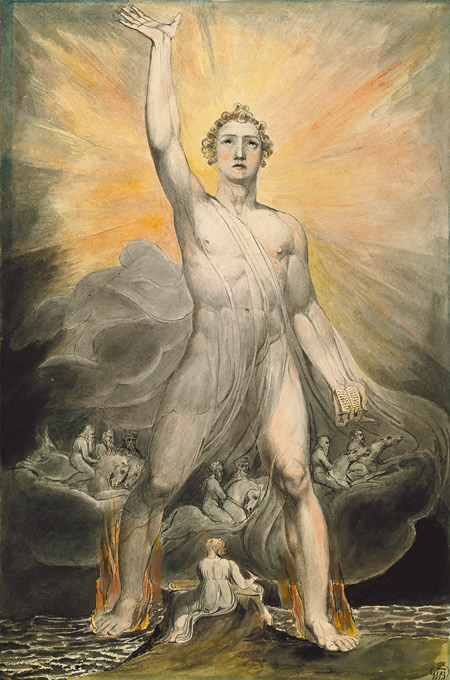
Angel of the Revelation by William Blake, created between c. 1803 and c. 1805

== Christianity ==
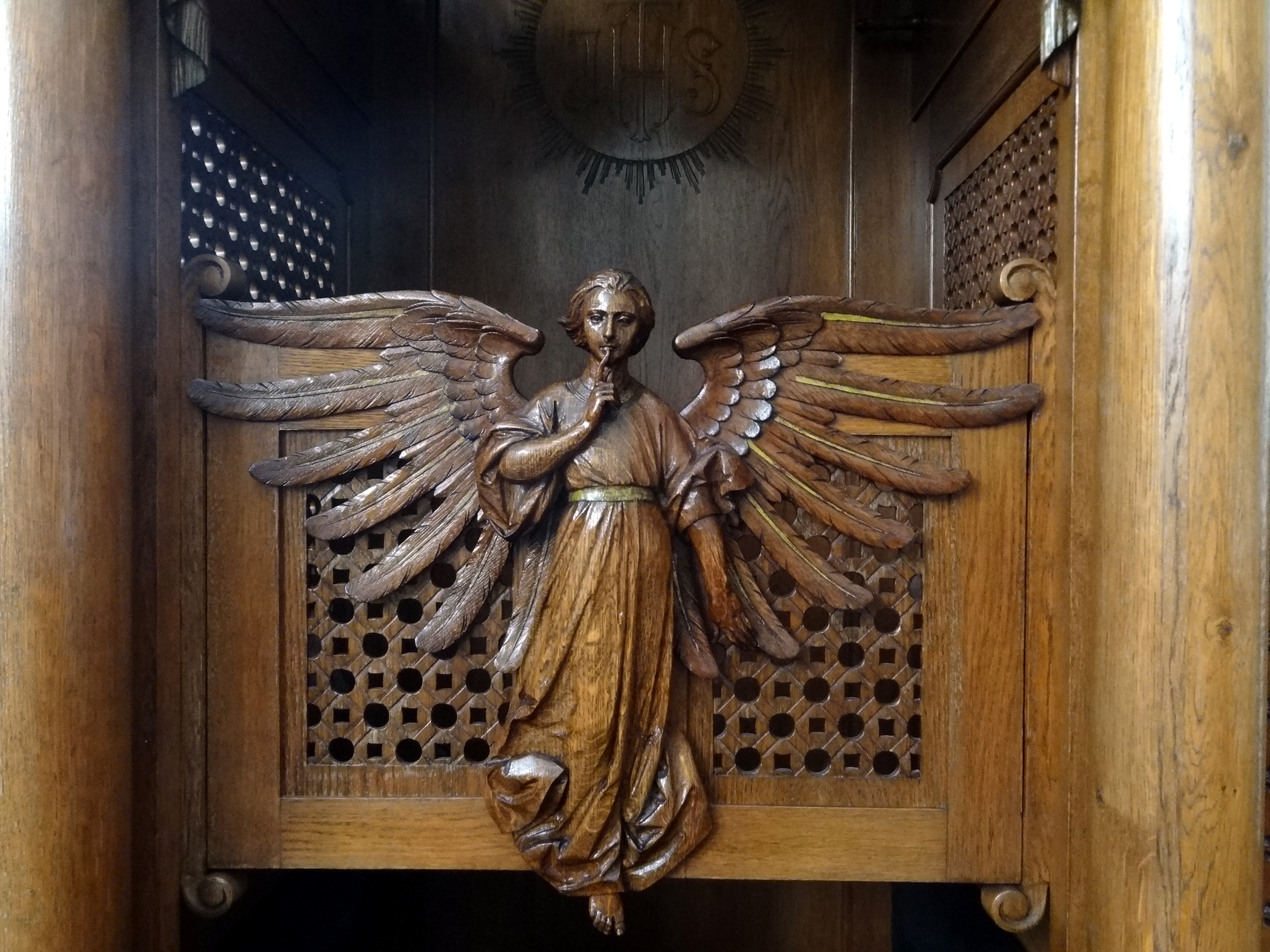
An angel on a confessional in a Roman Catholic church in Warsaw, Poland, as a metaphor of the seal of confession

The Medieval Christian concept of angels derives from Hebrew and Greek scriptures. In the Bible, angels are anthropomorphized intermediaries between God and humanity. Some angels appear to be impersonal forces of the divine will, while others have individual names and personalities.

In the formative stage, the Christian concept of an angel characterized the angel as a 'messenger' of God. The word "angel" can be drawn to the term or role of a "messenger" throughout the Bible in both old and new testaments – (Hebrews 1:14) calls them "ministering [or serving] spirits", sent by God to aid the "heirs of salvation". Later came identification of individual angelic messengers: Gabriel, Michael, Raphael, and Uriel. Then, in the space of slightly over two centuries (from the 3rd to the 5th) the image of angels took on definite characteristics both in theology and in art. Ellen Muehlberger has argued that in Late Antiquity, angels were conceived of as one type of being among many, whose primary purpose was to guard and to guide Christians.

In systematic Christian theology, angels are imagined as incorporeal entities and in opposition to corporeal humans, as in the writings of Origen and Thomas Aquinas.

=== Bible ===
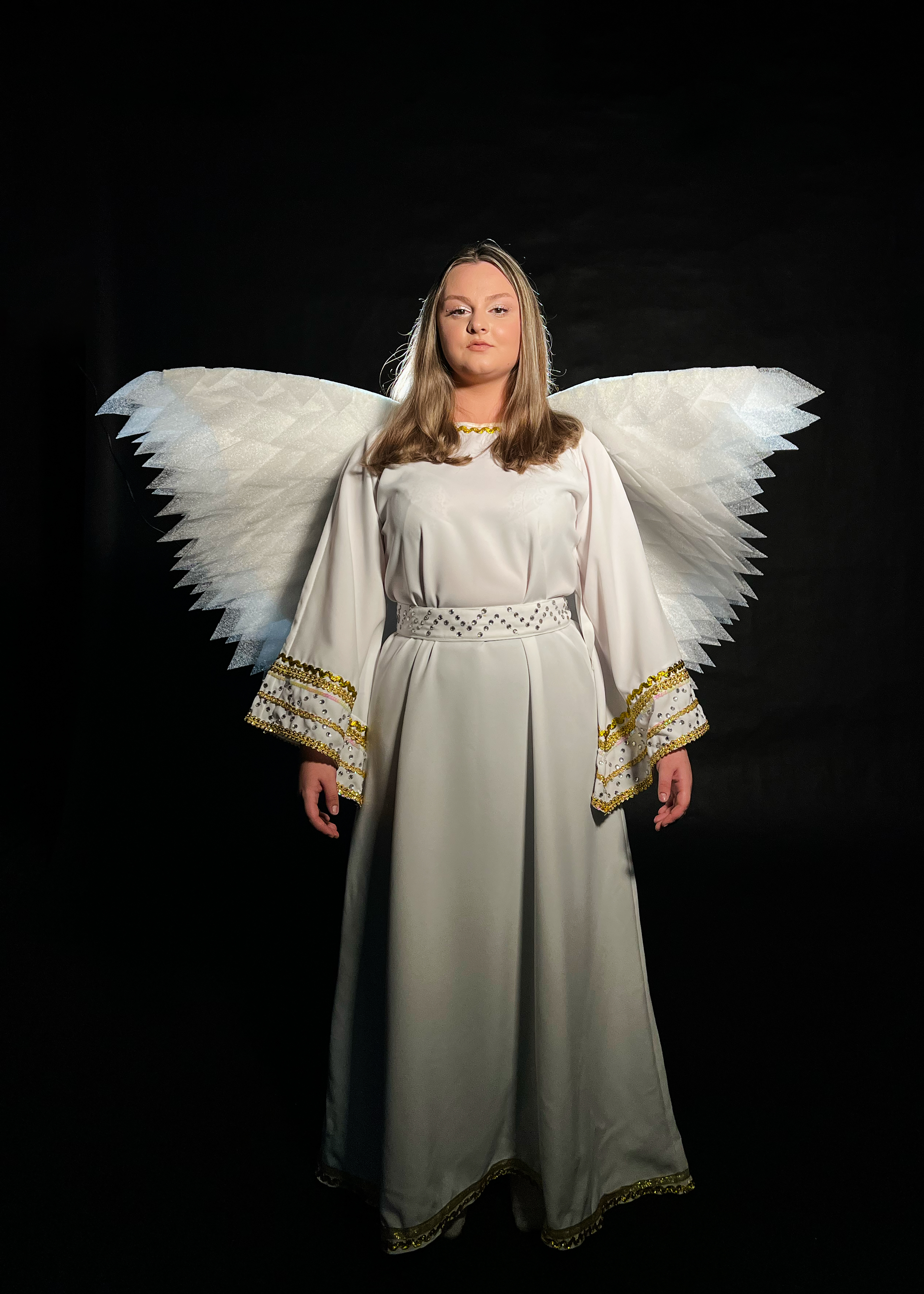
The Angel—a character from the Ukrainian Vertep (Nativity Scene). Photo from the "Virtual Vertep Vision" collection, 2025.

Angels are represented throughout Bibles as spiritual beings which are intermediate between God and humanity: "For thou hast made him [man] a little lower than the angels, and hast crowned him with glory and honour" (Psalms 8:4–5). Christians, based on Psalms and Genesis 2:1, believe that angels were the first beings created by God before the creation of Earth (Psalms 148:2–5; Colossians 1:16). Greek translations of the Hebrew Bible refer to intermediary beings as angels, instead of daimons, thus giving raise to a distinction between demons and angels. In the Old Testament, both benevolent and fierce angels are mentioned, but never called demons. The symmetry lies between angels sent by God, and intermediary spirits of foreign deities, not in good and evil deeds.

In the New Testament, the existence of angels, just like that of demons, is taken for granted. They can intervene and intercede on behalf of humans. Angels protect the righteous (Matthew 4:6, Luke 4:11). They dwell in the heavens (Matthew 28:2, John 1:51), act as God's warriors (Matthew 26:53) and worship God (Luke 2:13). In the parable of the Rich man and Lazarus, angels behave as psychopomps (Luke 16:22). The Resurrection of Jesus features angels, telling the woman that Jesus is no longer in the tomb, but has risen from the dead. Angels don't marry (Matthew 22:30, Mark 12:25, and Luke 20:34–46).

Paul the Apostle acknowledges good (2 Cor 11:14; Gal 1:8; 4:14) and evil angels in his writings. According to 1 Corinthians 6:3, angels will be judged by God, implying that angels can be both good and evil. Some scholars suggest that Gal 3:19 means that the Law of Moses was introduced by angels rather than God, combined with his statements in Galatians, implies a negative role. In Colossians 2:18, Paul criticizes the worship of angels.

==== Interaction with humans ====
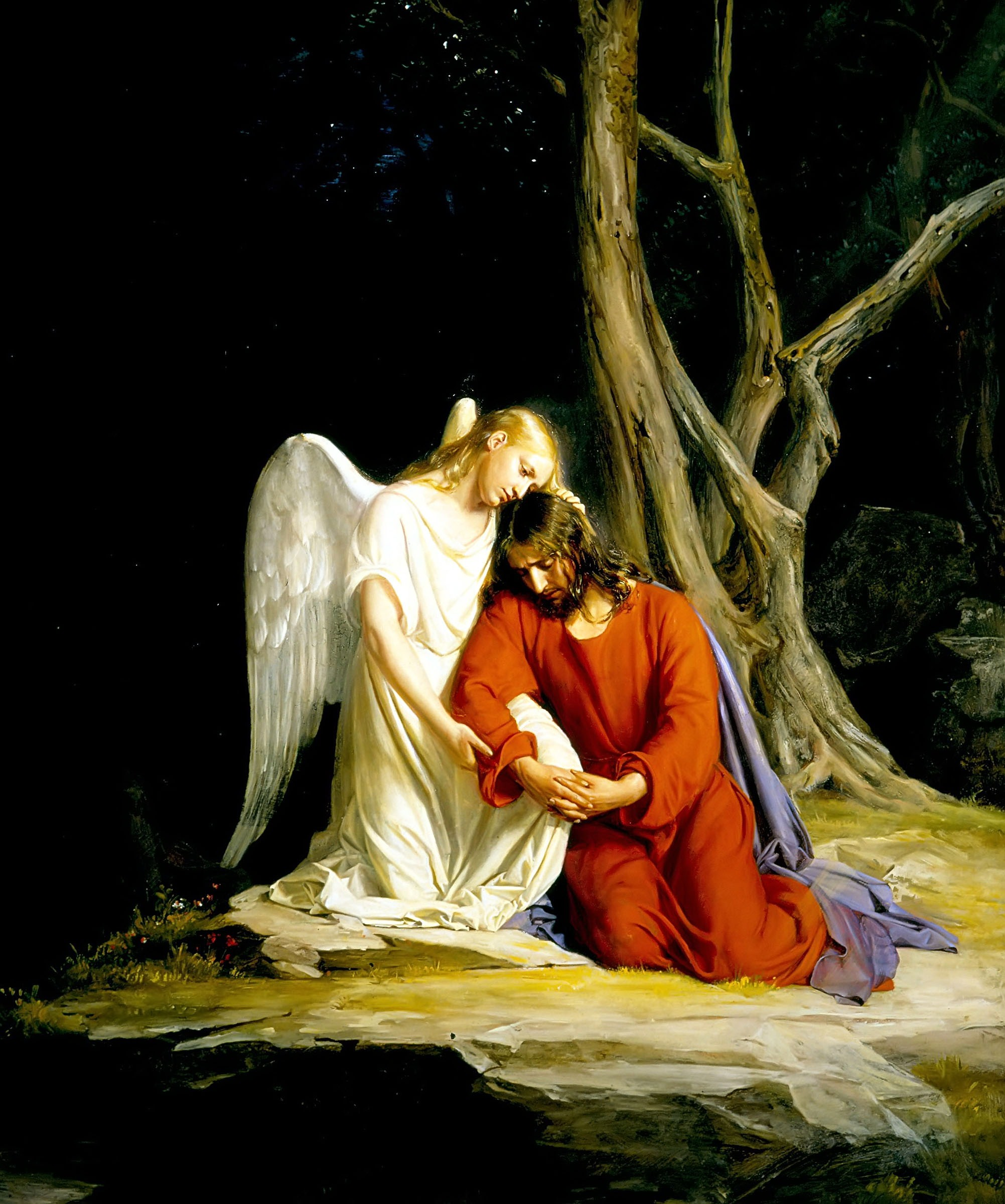
Kristus i Getsemane (1873), an angel comforting Jesus before his arrest in the Garden of Gethsemane, by Carl Heinrich Bloch (1834–1890)

Forget not to show love unto strangers: for thereby some have entertained angels unawares.—Hebrews 13:2

Three separate cases of angelic interaction deal with the births of John the Baptist and Jesus. In (Luke 1:11), an angel appears to Zechariah to inform him that he will have a child despite his old age, thus proclaiming the birth of John the Baptist. In Luke 1:26, Gabriel visits Mary in the Annunciation to foretell the birth of Jesus. Angels proclaim the birth of Jesus in the Adoration of the shepherds in Luke 2:10.

According to Matthew 4:11, after Jesus spent 40 days in the desert, "...the Devil left him and, behold, angels came and ministered to him." In Luke 22:43 an angel comforts Jesus during the Agony in the Garden. In Matthew 28:5 an angel speaks at the empty tomb, following the Resurrection of Jesus and the rolling back of the stone by angels.

In 1851 Pope Pius IX approved the Chaplet of Saint Michael based on the 1751 reported private revelation from archangel Michael to the Carmelite nun Antonia d'Astonac. In a biography of Gemma Galgani written by Germanus Ruoppolo, Galgani stated that she had spoken with her guardian angel.

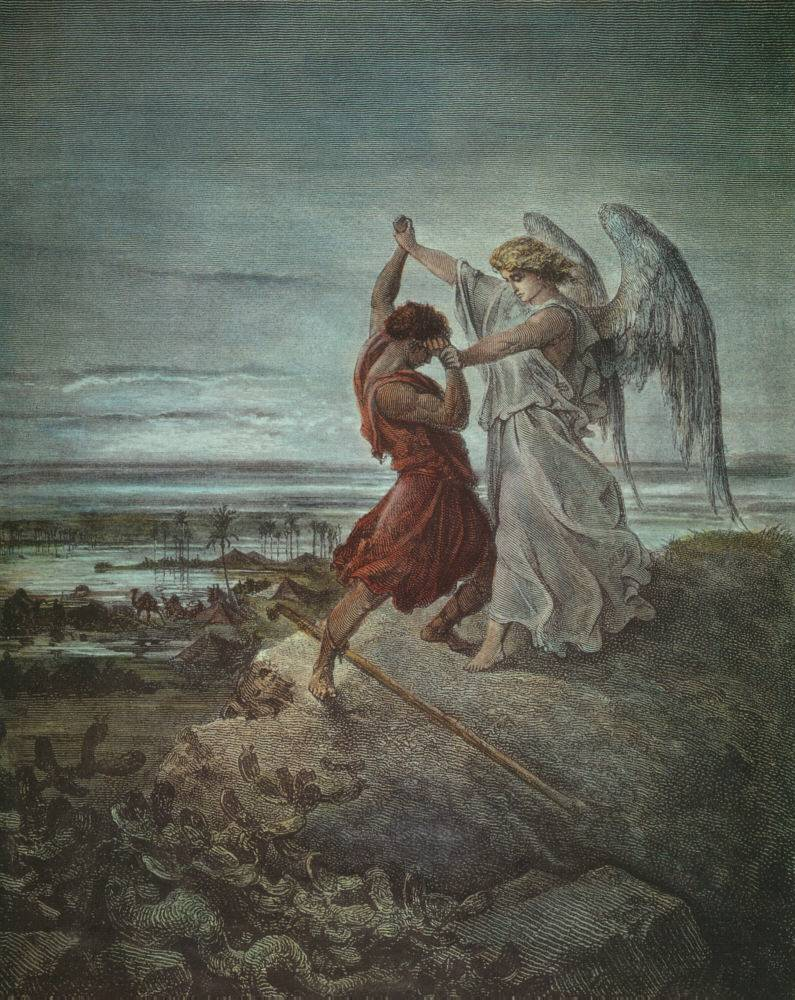
Jacob Wrestling with the Angel, by Gustave Doré in 1855

Pope John Paul II emphasized the role of angels in Catholic teachings in his 1986 address titled "Angels Participate In History Of Salvation", in which he suggested that modern mentality should come to see the importance of angels.

According to the Vatican's Congregation for Divine Worship and the Discipline of the Sacraments, "The practice of assigning names to the Holy Angels should be discouraged, except in the cases of Gabriel, Raphael and Michael whose names are contained in Holy Scripture."

=== Theology ===
By the late 4th century, the Church Fathers agreed that there were different categories of angels, with appropriate missions and activities assigned to them. There was, however, some disagreement regarding the nature of angels. Some argued that angels had physical bodies, while some maintained that they were entirely spiritual. Some theologians had proposed that angels were not divine but on the level of immaterial beings subordinate to the Trinity. The resolution of this Trinitarian dispute included the development of doctrine about angels.

According to Augustine of Hippo, the term 'angel' refers to "the name of their office, not [...] their nature", as they are pure spirits who act as messengers, clarifying: "If you seek the name of their nature, it is 'spirit'; if you seek the name of their office, it is 'angel': from what they are, 'spirit', from what they do, 'angel'." Gregory of Nazianzus thought that angels were made as "spirits" and "flames of fire", following Hebrews 1, and that they can be identified with the "thrones, dominions, rulers and authorities" of Colossians 1.

Forty Gospel Homilies by Pope Gregory I (c. 540 – 12 March 604) noted angels and archangels. The Fourth Lateran Council's (1215) Firmiter credimus decree (issued against the Albigenses) declared that the angels were created beings and that men were created after them. The First Vatican Council (1869) repeated this declaration in Dei Filius, the "Dogmatic constitution on the Catholic faith".

In the Middle Ages, theologians had to address Augustine's ideas of "angelic knowledge", as set out in De Genesi ad litteram, which he divided into "morning" knowledge, knowledge of Creation before it is created derived from direct access to the Word of God, and "evening" knowledge, knowledge of Creation derived from perceiving it after it has been created. Thomas Aquinas (13th century) related angels to Aristotle's metaphysics in his Summa contra Gentiles, Summa Theologica, the 8th question of Quaestiones Disputatae de Veritate, and in De substantiis separatis, a treatise on angelology.

Aquinas varied significantly from the Augustinian view in two major respects: angels were not created in an initial state of bliss, and only beatified angels have "morning" knowledge. In other words: angels have an angelic nature, but in their natural states have no access to Divine "morning" knowledge of Creation, which they only gain with supernatural assistance. This was Aquinas' most original contribution to Christian angelology. Although angels have greater knowledge than men, they are not omniscient, as Matthew 24:36 points out.

According to the Summa Theologica, angels were created instantaneously by God in a state of grace in the Empyrean Heaven (LXI. 4) at the same time when he created all the contents of the corporeal world (LXI. 3). They are pure spirits whose life consists in knowledge and love. Being bodiless, their knowledge is intellectual and not through senses (LIV. 5). Differently from humans, their knowledge is not acquired from the exterior world (having acquired all knowledge they would ever receive in the moment of their creation); moreover they attain to the truth of a thing at a single glance without need of reasoning (LV. a; LVIII. 3,4). They know all that passes in the external world (LV. 2) and the totality of creatures, but they do not know human secret thoughts that depends on human free will and thereby are not necessarily linked with external events (LVII. 4). They do not know the future unless God reveals it to them (LVII. 3).

According to Aquinas, angels are the closest creatures to God. Therefore, like God, they are constituted by pure form without matter. While they do not have a physical composition of matter and form (called hylomorphism), they possess the metaphysical composition of act (the act of being) and potency (their finite essence, yet without being). Each angel is a species to which a unique individual belongs; angels differ one from another by way of their unique and irrepetible form. In other words, form – and not matter – is their principle of individuation.

== Islam ==
Depiction of an angel in a Persian miniature (Iran, 1555)

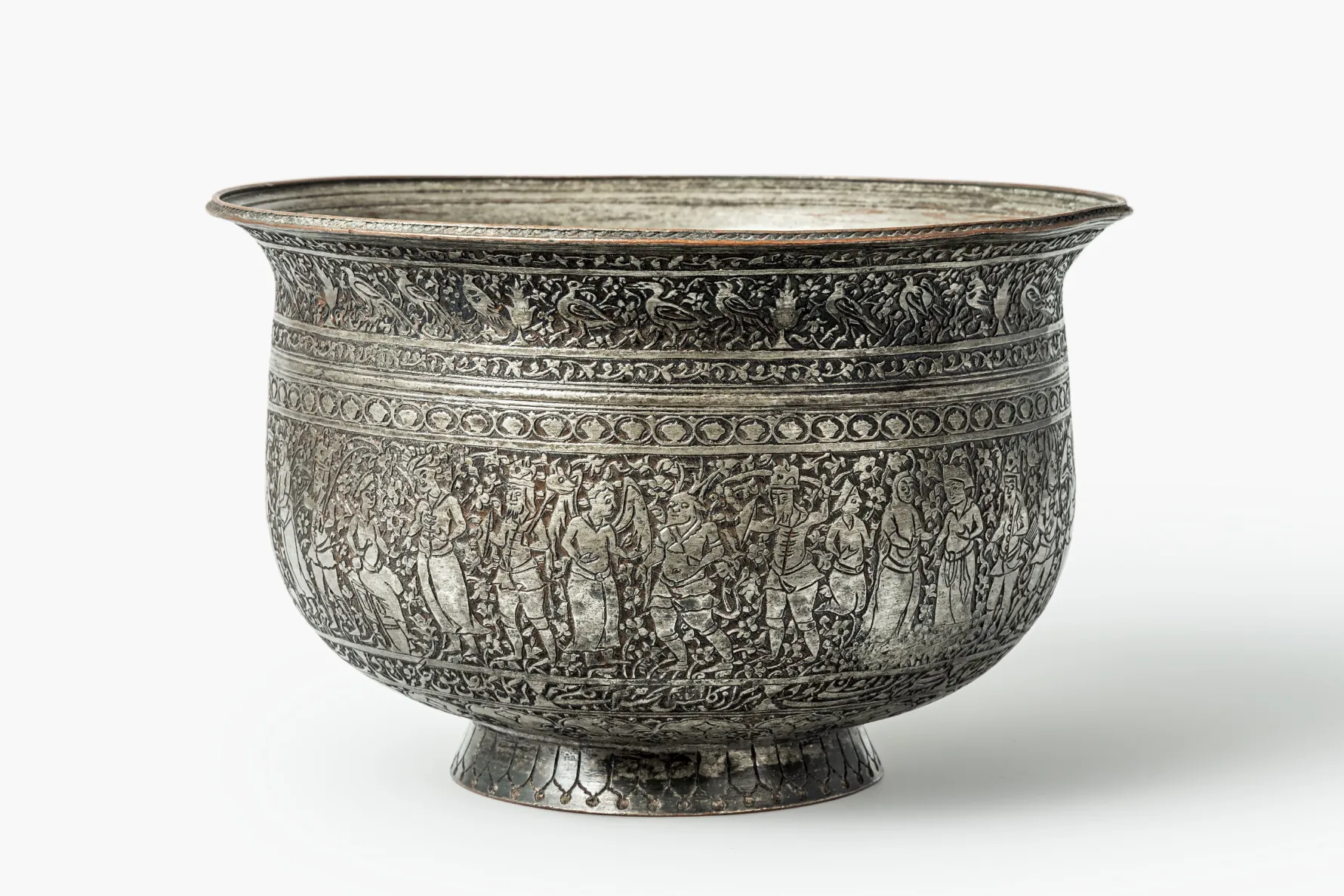
Bowl with humans, angels, and divs (demons). Iran Qajar dynasty, 1215-1221 A.H. (1800-1805). Museum für Kunst und Gewerbe Hamburg, Germany. This bowl depicts humans, angels, and horned demons.

Belief in angels is fundamental to Islam. The Quranic word for angel (Arabic: ملاك Malāk) derives either from Malaka, meaning "he controlled", due to their power to govern different affairs assigned to them, or from the root either from ʼ-l-k, l-ʼ-k or m-l-k with the broad meaning of a "messenger", just like its counterparts in Hebrew (malʾákh) and Greek (angelos). Unlike their Hebrew counterpart, the term is exclusively used for heavenly spirits of the divine world, but not for human messengers. The Quran refers to both angelic and human messengers as "rasul" instead.

The Quran is the principal source for the Islamic concept of angels. Some of them, such as Gabriel and Michael, are mentioned by name in the Quran, others are only referred to by their function. Most Muslim theologians, such as al-Suyuti, based on a hadith stating that the angels have been created through light (nūr) or fire (nār), depict angels as entities consisting of substance, in contrast to philosophers who argued for angels being disembodied spirits. Additionally, angels are thought to be endowed with reason and be subject to God's tests. Al-Maturidi (853–944 CE) states that the inhabitants of heaven were tested by adornments, just as humans and jinn on earth were tested, pointing at Sūrat al-Kahf [Q. 18:7]. When angels fail their tests, they might end up on earth, such as Harut and Marut. If the devils (šayāṭīn) have been angels once or form a separate type of creature from the beginning, is discussed in Islamic tradition. Contrary to popular belief, angels are never described as agents of revelation in the Quran, although interpretation credits Gabriel with that. Angels are not limited to benevolent tasks, but can also carry out grim orders. Not demons, but angels are tasked to guard and punish sinners in hell.

Angels play a significant role in Mi'raj literature, where Muhammad encounters several angels during his journey through the heavens. Further angels have often been featured in Islamic eschatology, Islamic theology and Islamic philosophy. Individual angels are further evoked in exorcism rites, with their names engraved in talismans or amulets to call upon their powers.

=== Theology (Kalām) ===
==== Classical period ====
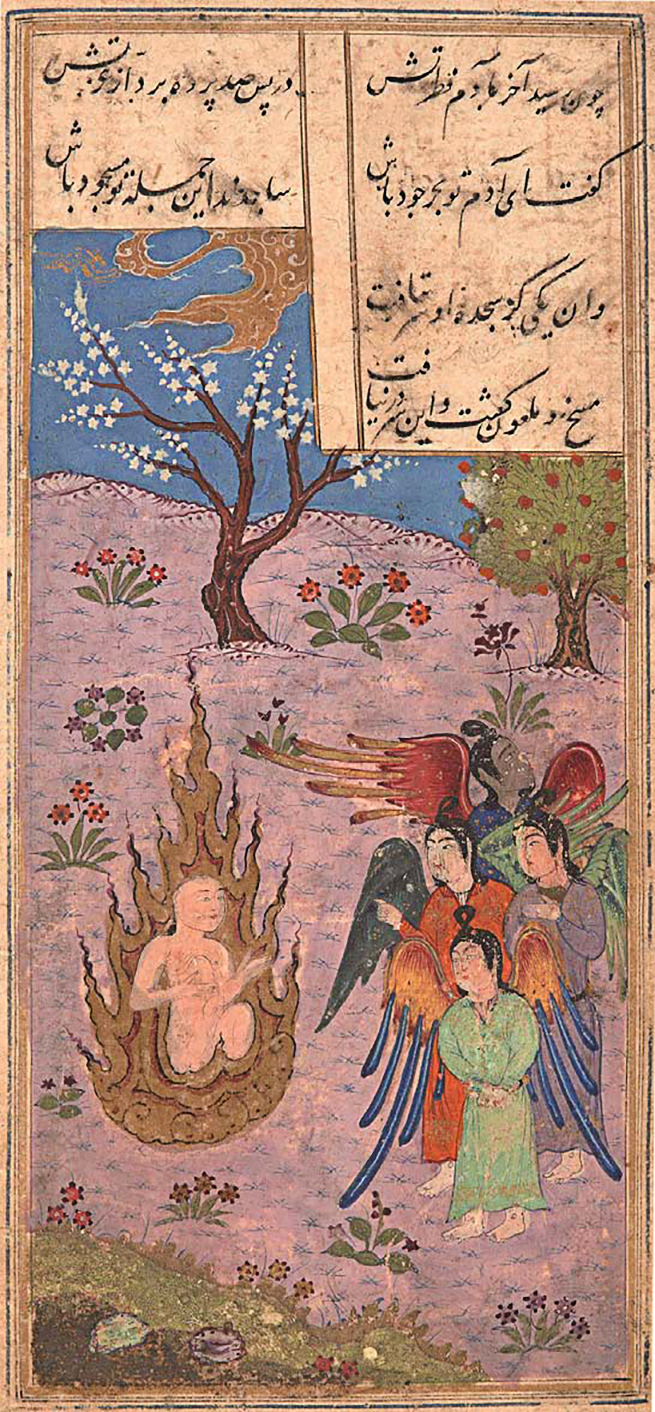
The Angels meet Adam, the prototypical human being, before they are being tested to prostrate themselves before Adam. They share, albeit to a lesser degree, the defiant reaction of Iblis, the future devil, who, in contrast to the angels, is depicted with a dark face. Painting from a manuscript of the Manṭiq al-ṭayr (The Conference of the Birds) of Farīd al-Dīn ʿAṭṭār. Iran, Shiraz, 899/1494.

Islamic theology usually distinguishes between three types of invisible creatures: angels (malāʾikah), djinn, and devils (šayāṭīn). Islamic theologian al-Ghazali (c. 1058–1111) divides human nature into four domains, each representing another type of creature: animals, beasts, devils and angels. Reconciling the literal meaning (Ẓāhir) with the Avicennan cosmology of falsafa of angels, he identified angels with the "celestial intellects" or "immaterial souls". Angels, made from light (Nūr) and thus associated with reason ('aql), represent the intellectual capacity of a human and the ability to bound the devilish qualities from within. By that, Ghazali does not deny the literal reality of angels, but rejects that they could be perceived directly.

Although belief in angels remains one of Six Articles of Faith in Islam, one can not find a dogmatic angelology in Islamic tradition. However, theologians generally distinguish between the angels in heaven (karubiyin), fully absorbed in the ma'rifa (knowledge) of God, and the messengers (rasūl) who carry out divine decrees between heaven and earth. Others add a third group of angels, and categorize angels into İlliyyûn Mukarrebûn (those around God's throne), Mudabbirât (carrying the laws of nature), and Rasūl (messengers). Al-Baydawi based this divide into two groups on Quranic verses: angels who are self-immersed in knowledge of "the Truth" (al-Haqq), based on "they laud night and day, they never wane" (21:29), they are the "highmost" and "angels brought near" and those who are the executors of commands, based on "they do not disobey Allah in what He commanded them but they do what they are commanded" (66:6), who are the administers of the command of heaven to earth.

==== Modern and Contemporary movements ====
Some modern scholars have emphasized a metaphorical reinterpretation of the concept of angels.

Salafism and Wahhabism generally emphasize a literal interpretation of angels against modernistic interpretations, as for example, suggested by Nasr Abu Zayd. Simultaneously, many traditional materials regarding angels accepted during the Classical period are often disregarded by Wahhabis and Salafis. The Muslim Brotherhood scholars Sayyid Qutb and Umar Sulaiman Al-Ashqar reject much established material from earlier periods, for example, the story of Harut and Marut or calling the Angel of Death Azrail. Sulayman Ashqar not only rejects the traditional material itself, but also disapproves of previous scholars who used such reports.

=== Iconography ===
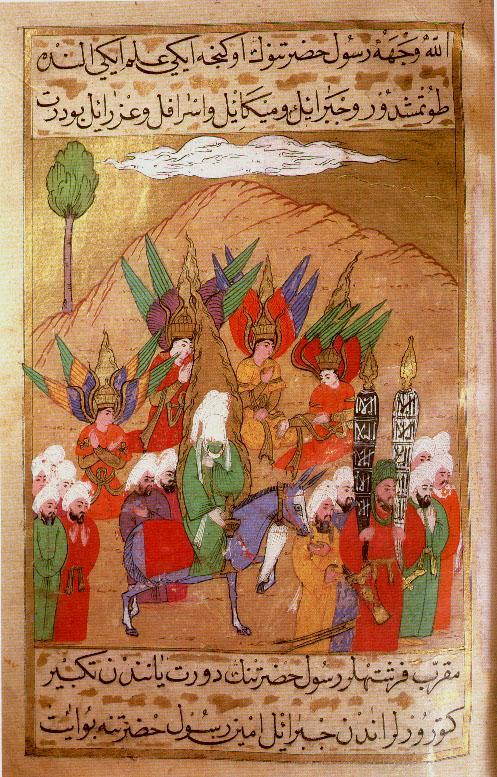
Muhammad advancing on Mecca, with the angels jibril, Mikail, Israfil and Azrail. (Siyer-i Nebi, 16th century)

In Islam, just like in Judaism and Christianity, angels are often represented in anthropomorphic forms combined with supernatural images, such as wings, being of great size or wearing heavenly articles. The Quran describes them as "messengers with wings—two, or three, or four: He [God] adds to Creation as He pleases..." The 13th century book Ajā'ib al-makhlūqāt wa gharā'ib al-mawjūdāt (The Wonders of Creation) by Zakariya al-Qazwini describes Islamic angelology, and is often illustrated with many images of angels. The angels are typically depicted with bright, vivid colors, giving them unusual liveliness and other-worldly translucence. While some angels are referred to as "Guardians of the Kingdom of God," others are associated with hell. An undated manuscript of The Wonders of Creation from the Bavarian State Library in Munich includes depictions of angels both alone and alongside humans and animals. Angels are also illustrated in Timurid and Ottoman manuscripts, such as The Timurid Book of the Prophet Muhammad's Ascension (Mir'ajnama) and the Siyer-i Nebi.

== Baháʼí faith ==
In his Kitáb-i-Íqán Baháʼu'lláh, founder of the Baháʼí Faith, describes angels as people who "have consumed, with the fire of the love of God, all human traits and limitations", and have "clothed themselves" with angelic attributes and have become "endowed with the attributes of the spiritual". ʻAbdu'l-Bahá describes angels as the "confirmations of God and His celestial powers" and as "blessed beings who have severed all ties with this nether world" and "been released from the chains of self", and "revealers of God's abounding grace". The Baháʼí writings also refer to the Concourse on High, an angelic host, and the Maid of Heaven of Baháʼu'lláh's vision.

I raised my hand another time, and bared one of Her breasts that had been hidden beneath Her gown. Then the firmament was illumined by the radiance of its light, contingent beings were made resplendent by its appearance and effulgence, and by its rays, infinite numbers of suns dawned forth, as though they trekked through heavens that were without beginning or end. I became bewildered at the pen of God's handiwork, and at what it had inscribed upon Her temple. It was as though She had appeared with a body of light in the forms of the spirit, as though She moved upon the earth of essence in the substance of manifestation. I noticed that the houris had poked their heads out of their rooms and were suspended in the air above Her. They grew perplexed at Her appearance and Her beauty and were entranced by the raptures of Her song. Praise be to Her creator, fashioner, and maker--to the one Who made Her manifest.

Then she nearly swooned within herself, and with all her being she sought to inhale My fragrance. She opened Her lips, and the rays of light dawned forth from Her teeth, as though the pearls of the cause had appeared from Her treasures and Her shells.

She asked, "Who art Thou?"

I said, "A servant of God and the son of his maidservant."

— Tablet of the Maiden, Baháʼu'lláh

== Philosophy ==
=== Ethics ===
Western Christian philosophy utlized angels as a thought experiment about moral decision making. Angels, as purely spiritual beings, served as an example on how someone makes decisions during optimal psychological and cognitive conditions. The voluntarist account maintains that choices are based on free-will and that angels either stayed in heaven or fell by their own volution. While the intellectualists need to explain how a spiritual being can suffer from cognitive deficiencies, voluntarists need to explain how beings under the same psychological conditions make different moral choices. Henry of Ghent (c. 1217 – 29 June 1293) asserts that evil volition must precede mistaken consideration. Defective reasoning is described as the result of evil will. Thomas Aquinas (c. 1225 – 7 March 1274), following an intellectualist approach, argued that the mind cannot comprehend all thoughts at once. As such, angels only consider on whatever they focus on, but if they do not focus on the highest good, they commit evil actions. Therefore, decisions are based on intellectual capacity rather than free-will.

Muslim theologian Fakhr al-Din al-Razi (1149 or 1150–1209) demonstrated his virtue ethics on the famous discussion as whether angels or prophets are more noble. While proposing a voluntarist theory earlier, which regarded voluntary actions of humans higher than obedience of angels, his later theories argue for the superiority of angels. Following the Falsafiyya and Mu'tazila, al-Razi describes angels as morally perfect beings. He argued that angels are perfect in power and knowledge and thus, there is no obstacle in their moral perfection, whereas humans suffer from physical limitations and cannot obtain moral excellence. Giving priority of essence and attributes over effort and actions, al-Razi constructs a virtue ethic in contrast to the consequentialist ethics more prevailing among his contemporaries.

=== Metaphysics ===
In Ancient Greek philosophy, there is no significant distinction made between good and evil spirits. Under Iranian influence, the sublunary sphere was traced to inspiring angels. Philo of Alexandria already identified the Neo-Platonic interpretation of daemons as angels. The daemons were thought to be intermediary between the supernatural and earthly realm, interpreted by Philo as the Greek term for angels.

In the commentaries of Proclus (4th century) on the Timaeus of Plato, Proclus uses the terminology of "angelic" (aggelikos) and "angel" (aggelos) in relation to metaphysical beings. According to Aristotle, just as there is a Prime Mover, so too, must there be spiritual secondary movers.

Ibn Sina, developed an angelological hierarchy of Intellects, which are created by "the One" (God). Accordingly, the first creation by God is the supreme intellect. From that intellect, intermediary spirits (angels) emanate. From these intellects, the intellect corresponding to the soul finally emerges. It is by the last Intellect that matter is animated and illuminates the mind.

Materialism removed angels from philosophical and scientific consideration. Thomas Hobbes declared angels to be "accidences of the brain" without any external reality. Immanuel Kant’s critique of knowledge further diminished the rational justification for angels.

In modern times, Lewis White Beck discerned the presence of a contemporary equivalent to ancient angelology and demonology within the context of the perpetual scientific search for extraterrestrial life. In Beck's view, the tales of benevolent and malevolent extraterrestrial beings which are enshrined within ancient myths, religious traditions and contemporary science-fiction serve as insightful commentaries on the human condition. Beck argues that along with our counterparts from ancient times, humanity is, "now suffering from technological shock, destroying by radiological and chemical, if not moral, pollution the only abode of life we know." Within the context of the anxiety derived from such uncertainty, modern man now searches for an eschatological form of renewed hope and consolation from the heavens of modern astronomy rather than the "Heaven of religion". In this sense, "even responsible scientific speculation and expensive technology of space exploration in search for other life are the peculiarly modern equivalent of angelology and Utopia or of demonology and apocalypse.

== Esotericism ==
=== Graeco-Roman world ===
The Greek magical papyri, a set of texts forming into a completed grimoire that date somewhere between 100 BC and 400 AD, also list the names of the angels found in monotheistic religions, but they are presented as deities. Michael, Raphael, and Gabriel, though of Jewish origin, were popular figures in Hellenistic Egyptian paganism.

=== Gnosticism ===
In Gnostic cosmologies, angels are generally hostile celestial powers. Numerous references to angels present themselves in the Nag Hammadi Library, in which they both appear as malevolent servants of the Demiurge and innocent associates of the aeons.

The angels are credited with creating the world and also its rulers in constant battle against each other. They are usurpers of spiritual powers to whom the Gnostic must strive against to become free from envy and greed, and eventually obtains salvation in the immaterial realms.

On the other hand, the soul may act as an angel-like messenger who reveals mysteries and awakens knowledge in human consciousness.

=== Hermetic Qabalah ===
According to the Kabbalah, as described by the Golden Dawn, there are ten archangels, each commanding one of the choirs of angels and corresponding to one of the Sephirot. It is similar to the Jewish angelic hierarchy.

Rank	Choir of Angels	Translation	Archangel	Sephirah
1	Hayot Ha Kodesh	Holy Living Ones	Metatron	Keter
2	Ophanim	Wheels	Raziel	Chokmah
3	Erelim	Brave ones	Tzaphkiel	Binah
4	Hashmallim	Glowing ones, Amber ones	Tzadkiel	Chesed
5	Seraphim	Burning Ones	Khamael	Gevurah
6	Malakim	Messengers, angels	Raphael	Tipheret
7	Elohim	Godly Beings	Uriel	Netzach
8	Bene Elohim	Sons of Elohim	Michael	Hod
9	Cherubim		Gabriel	Yesod
10	Ishim	Men (man-like beings, phonetically similar to "fires")	Sandalphon	Malkuth

=== Theosophy ===
In the teachings of the Theosophical Society, Devas are regarded as living either in the atmospheres of the planets of the Solar System (Planetary Angels) or inside the Sun (Solar Angels) and they help to guide the operation of the processes of nature such as the process of evolution and the growth of plants; their appearance is reputedly like colored flames about the size of a human. It is believed by Theosophists that devas can be observed when the third eye is activated. Some (but not most) devas originally incarnated as human beings.

It is believed by Theosophists that nature spirits, elementals (gnomes, undines, sylphs, and salamanders), and fairies also can be observed when the third eye is activated. It is maintained by Theosophists that these less evolutionarily developed beings have never been previously incarnated as humans; they are regarded as being on a separate line of spiritual evolution called the "deva evolution"; eventually, as their souls advance as they reincarnate, it is believed they will incarnate as devas.

It is asserted by Theosophists that all of the above-mentioned beings possess etheric bodies that are composed of etheric matter, a type of matter finer and more pure that is composed of smaller particles than ordinary physical plane matter.

== Yazidism ==
In Yazidism, there are seven Divine Beings (often called 'angels' in the literature) who were created by God prior to the creation of the world. God appointed Tawûsî Melek as their leader and assigned all of the world's affairs to these seven Divine Beings. These Divine Beings are referred to as Tawûsî Melek, Melek Şemsedîn, Melek Nasirdîn, Melek Fexredîn, Melek Sicadîn, Melek Şêxsin and Melek Şêxûbekir.

== In art ==
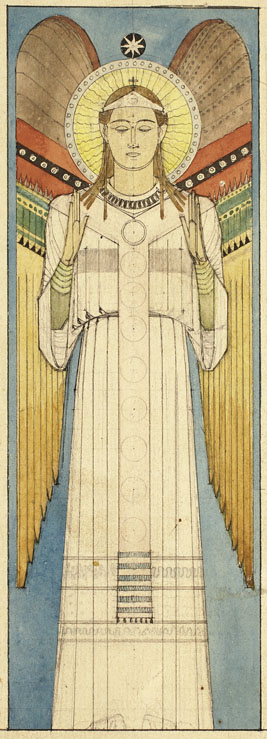
Draft for an Angel by Desiderius Lenz

According to mainstream Christian theology, angels are wholly spiritual beings and therefore do not eat, excrete or have sex, and have no gender. Although their different roles, such as warriors for some archangels, may suggest a human gender, Christian artists were careful not to give them specific gender attributes, at least until the 19th century, when some acquire breasts for example.

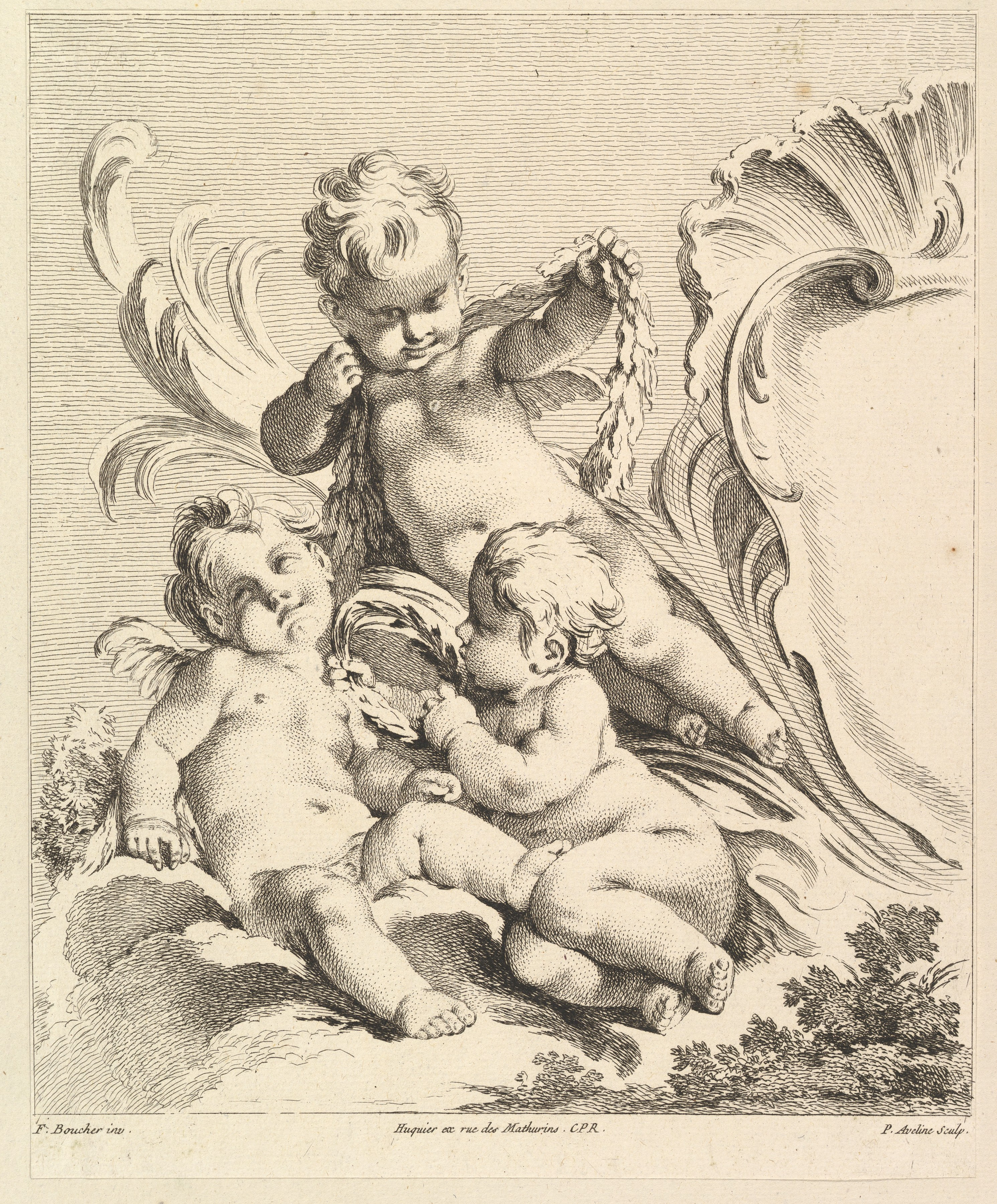
Three Putti Next to a Cartouche, after François Boucher, 1727–1760, etching and engraving, 26.5 × 21.5 cm, Metropolitan Museum of Art, New York City

In an address during a General Audience of 6 August 1986, entitled "Angels participate in the history of salvation", Pope John Paul II explained that "[T]he angels have no 'body' (even if, in particular circumstances, they reveal themselves under visible forms because of their mission for the good of people)." Christian art perhaps reflects the descriptions in Revelation 4:6–8 of the Four Living Creatures (Greek: τὰ τέσσαρα ζῷα) and the descriptions in the Hebrew Bible of cherubim and seraphim (the chayot in Ezekiel's Merkabah vision and the Seraphim of Isaiah). However, while cherubim and seraphim have wings in the Bible, no angel is mentioned as having wings. The earliest known Christian image of an angel—in the Cubicolo dell'Annunziazione in the Catacomb of Priscilla (mid-3rd century)—is without wings. In that same period, representations of angels on sarcophagi, lamps and reliquaries also show them without wings, as for example the angel in the Sacrifice of Isaac scene in the Sarcophagus of Junius Bassus (although the side view of the Sarcophagus shows winged angelic figures).

The earliest known representation of angels with wings is on the "Prince's Sarcophagus", attributed to the time of Theodosius I (379–395), discovered at Sarigüzel, near Istanbul, in the 1930s. From that period on, Christian art has represented angels mostly with wings, as in the cycle of mosaics in the Basilica of Saint Mary Major (432–440). Four- and six-winged angels, drawn from the higher grades of angels (especially cherubim and seraphim) and often showing only their faces and wings, are derived from Persian art and are usually shown only in heavenly contexts, as opposed to performing tasks on earth. They often appear in the pendentives of church domes or semi-domes. Prior to the Judeo–Christian tradition, in the Greek world the goddess Nike and the gods Eros and Thanatos were also depicted in human-like form with wings.

John Chrysostom explained the significance of angels' wings:

They manifest a nature's sublimity. That is why Gabriel is represented with wings. Not that angels have wings, but that you may know that they leave the heights and the most elevated dwelling to approach human nature. Accordingly, the wings attributed to these powers have no other meaning than to indicate the sublimity of their nature.

Angels are typically depicted in Mormon art as having no wings based on a quote from Joseph Smith ("An angel of God never has wings").

In terms of their clothing, angels, especially the Archangel Michael, were depicted as military-style agents of God and came to be shown wearing Late Antique military uniform. This uniform could be the normal military dress, with a tunic to about the knees, an armour breastplate and pteruges, but was often the specific dress of the bodyguard of the Byzantine Emperor, with a long tunic and the loros, the long gold and jewelled pallium restricted to the Imperial family and their closest guards.

The basic military dress was shown in Western art into the Baroque period and beyond (see Reni picture above), and up to the present day in Eastern Orthodox icons. Other angels came to be conventionally depicted in long robes, and in the later Middle Ages they often wear the vestments of a deacon, a cope over a dalmatic. This costume was used especially for Gabriel in Annunciation scenes—for example the Annunciation in Washington by Jan van Eyck.

Some types of angels are described as possessing more unusual or frightening attributes, such as the fiery bodies of the Seraphim, and the wheel-like structures of the Ophanim.

=== Angels in the Ukrainian Vertep ===
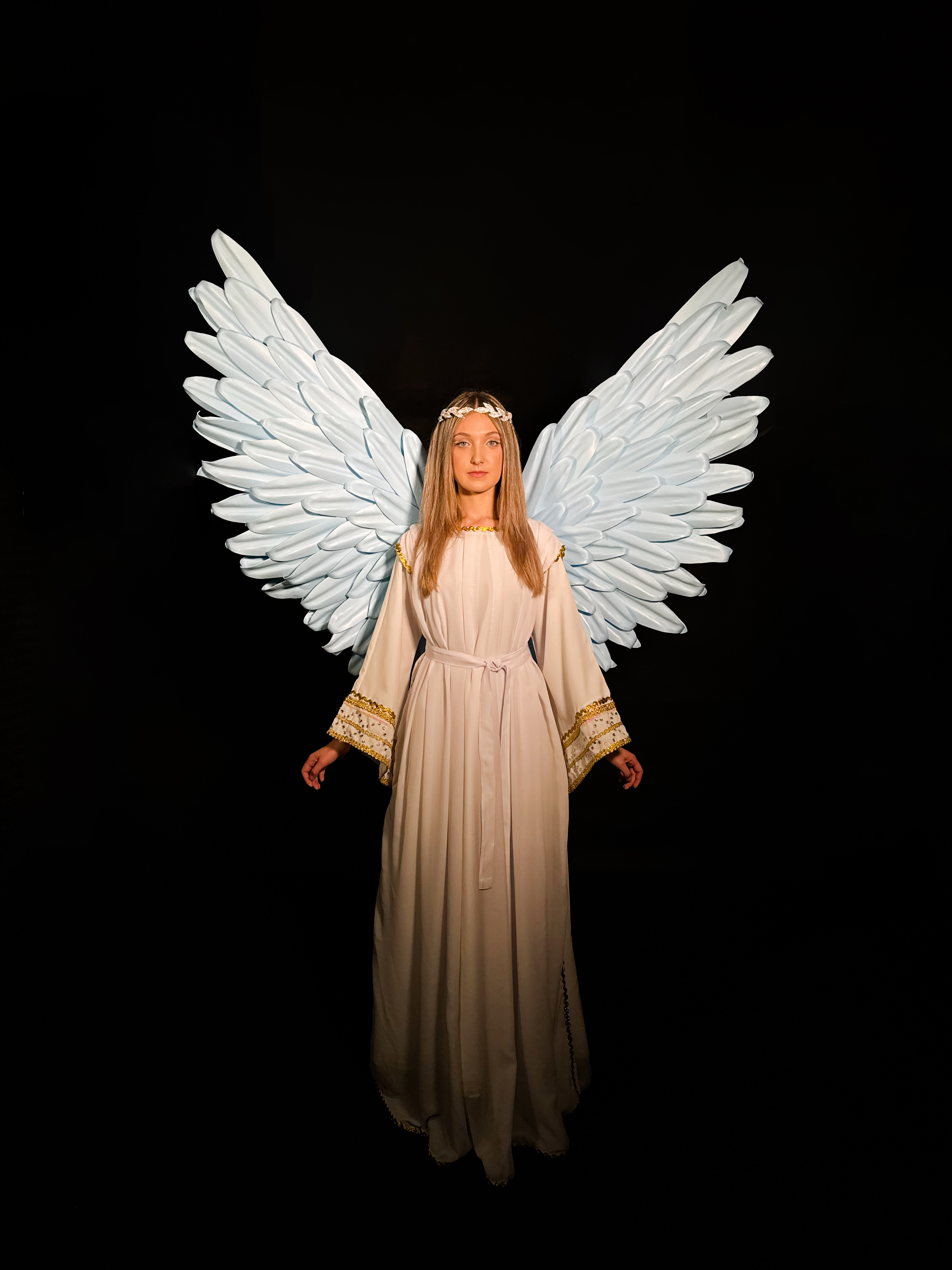
The Angel of Peace. Photo from the "Virtual Vertep Vision" collection. 2025

In the modern Ukrainian Vertep (Nativity play), it is common to feature several distinct types of angels, each serving a specific symbolic and narrative function:

- The Classic Angel: Traditionally dressed in white or gold and carrying a trumpet or a lily, this character serves a dual role. The angel acts as a guide for the shepherds and the Biblical Magi, and as a spiritual protector who confronts evil figures like King Herod and the Devil. The Classic Angel typically concludes the performance by delivering blessings of peace and prosperity to the audience.
- The Angel of Peace: Embodying the biblical message of "peace on earth," this figure is typically dressed in light blue or silver. Often holding an olive branch, a palm branch, or a lit candle, the Angel of Peace represents hope and reconciliation, echoing global cultural symbols of spiritual protection during times of conflict.
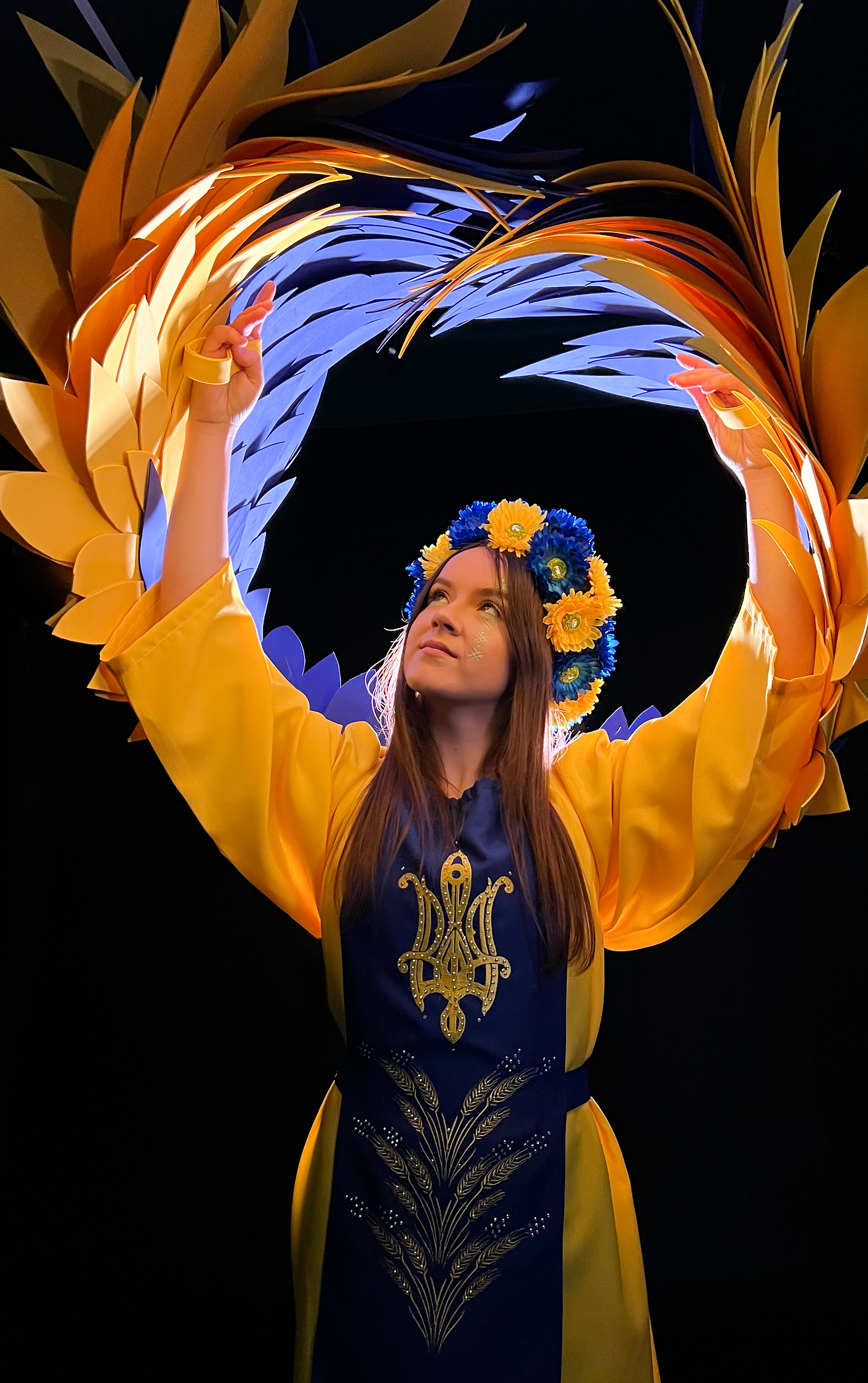
- The Angel of Ukraine. Photo from the "Virtual Vertep Vision" collection. 2025
  The Angel of Ukraine: Serving as the spiritual patron and guardian of the nation, this character is inspired by the early 20th-century mystical visions of Belgian priest Joseph Schrijvers at the Univ Lavra. The Angel of Ukraine wears the national colors of blue and yellow. Its attributes often include a sword to symbolize the defense of good, a lit candle representing faith, and golden wheat ears symbolizing life and the Ukrainian land.
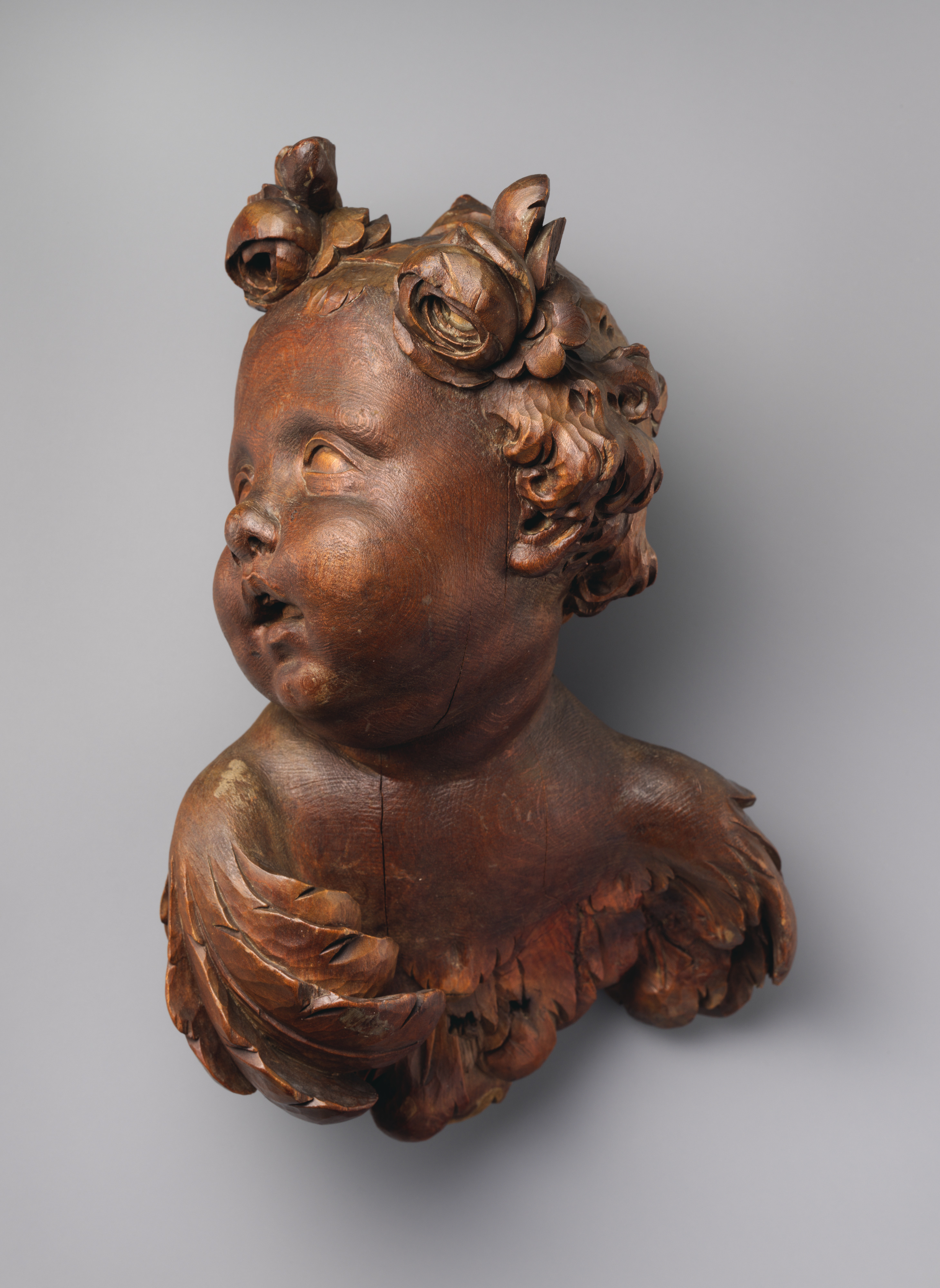
Southern German Baroque angel, by Ignaz Günther, circa 1760–1770, lindenwood with traces of gesso, 26.7 x 18.4 cm, Metropolitan Museum of Art

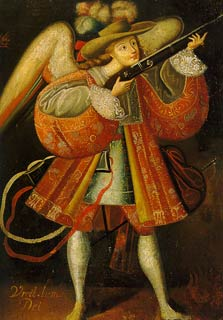
Arquebusier Angels, hundreds of colonial paintings depicting these angels, Colonial Bolivia and Peru, 17th century, were part of the Cusco Colonial Painting School

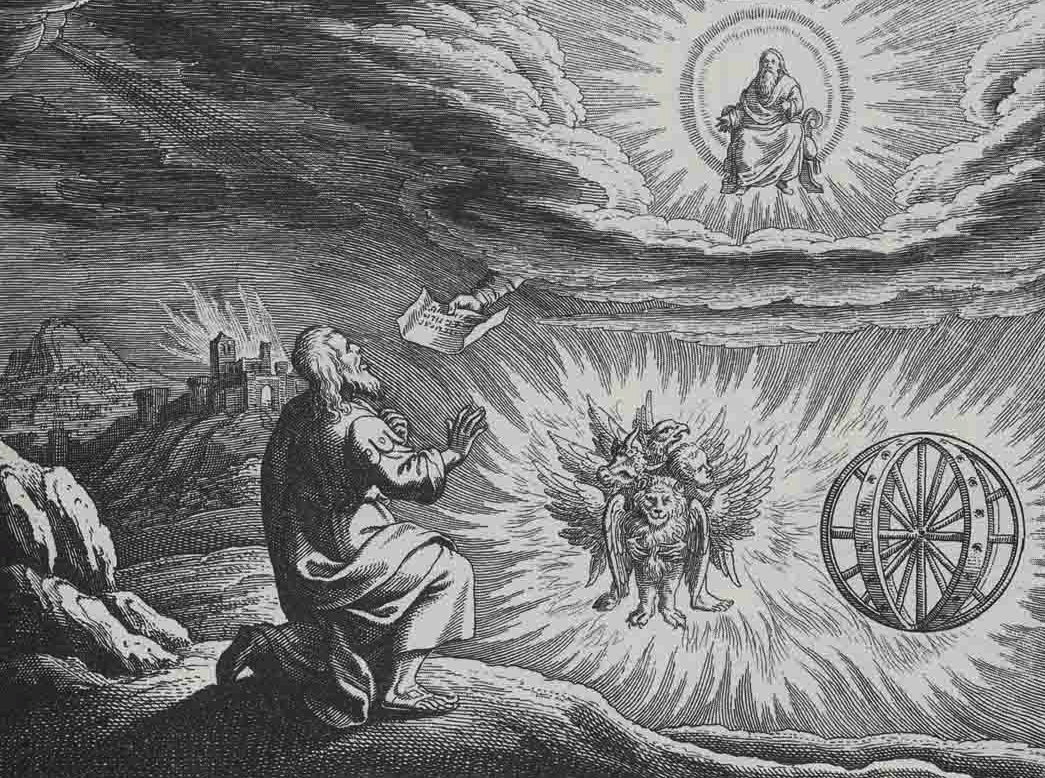
The extraordinary-looking Cherubim (immediately to the right of Ezekiel) and Ophanim (the nested-wheels) appear in the chariot vision of Ezekiel

An angel in the former coat of arms of Tenala

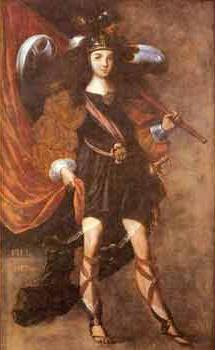
Sopó Archangels, a series of archangels painted around 1650 in colonial Colombia.

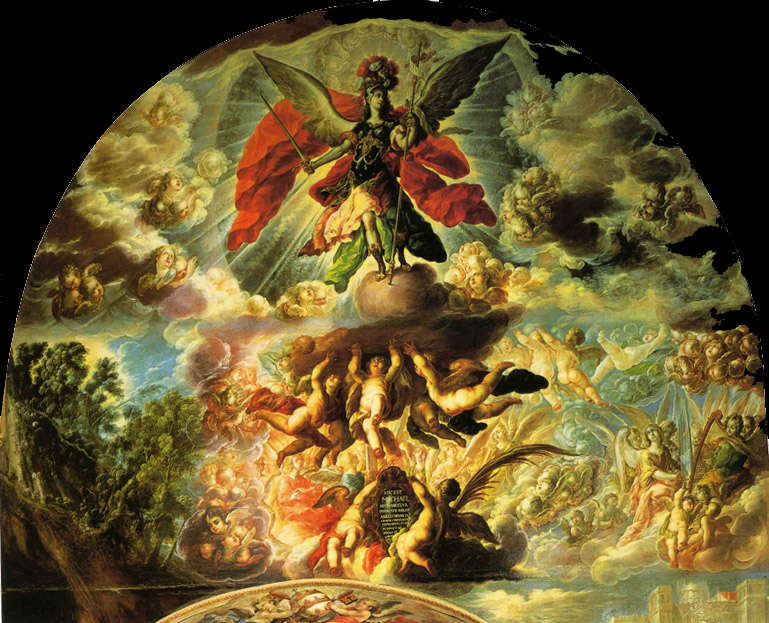
Apparition of Saint Michael, ca. 1686 by Cristóbal de Villalpando. Mexico City Metropolitan Cathedral collection. Colonial Mexico.

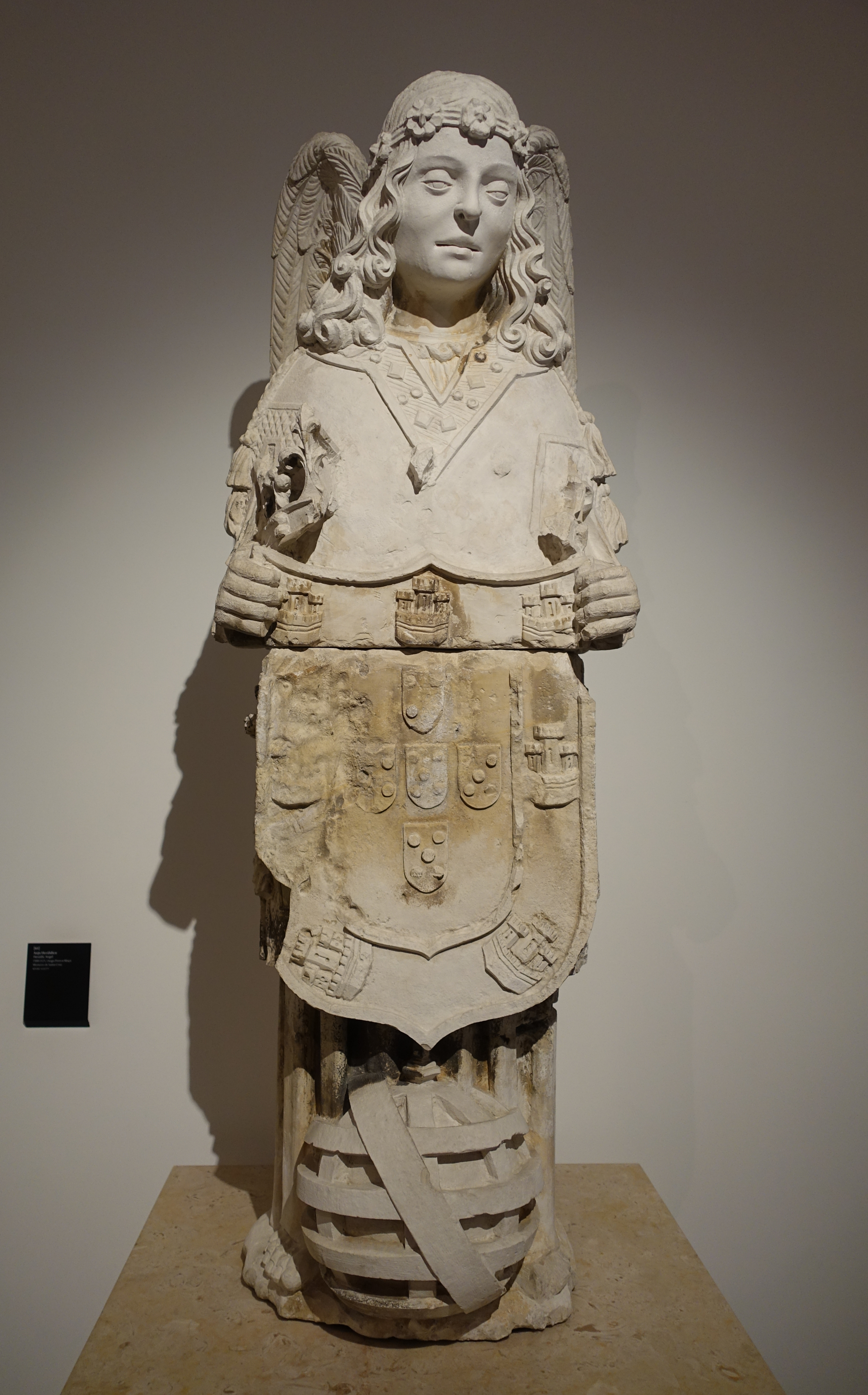
16th century stone statue depicting the Angel of Portugal, at the Machado de Castro National Museum, in Portugal.

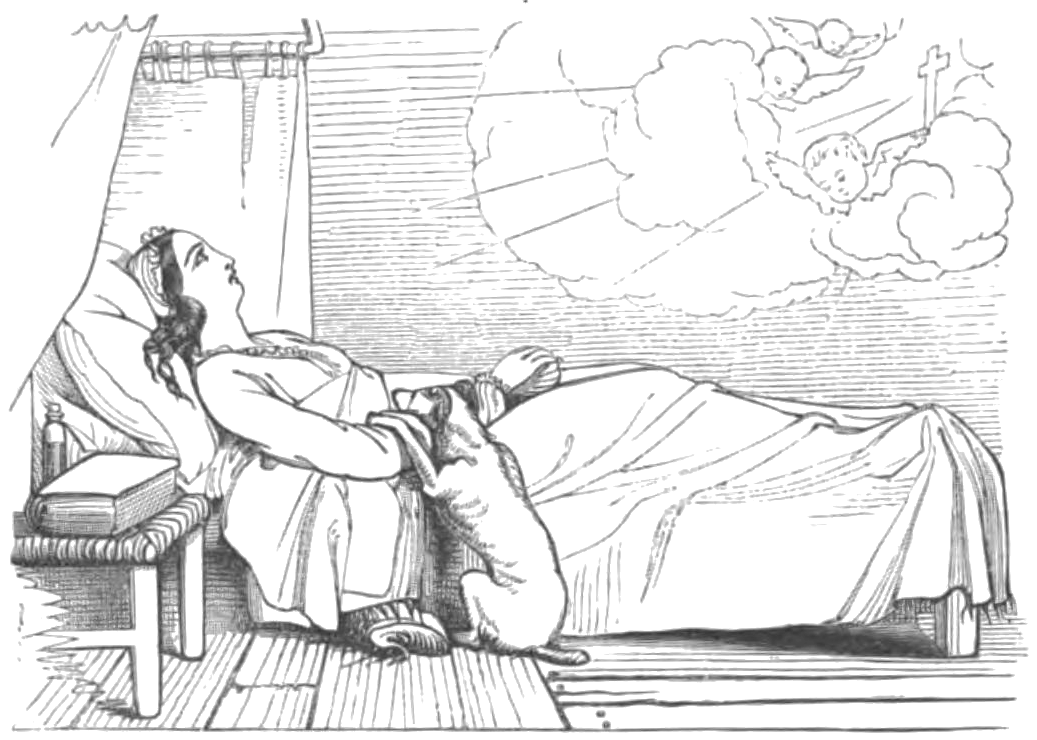
An illustration of a dying woman witnessing angels, presumably depicting a deathbed vision, by Frederick William Fairholt for the 1844 short story "A Forlorn Hope".

== See also ==
- Angel of the North
- Angels in art
- Apsara
- Chalkydri
- George Clayton
- Classification of demons
- Cupid and Erotes
- Dakini
- Demigod
- Elioud
- Eudaemon (mythology)
- Exorcism
- Gandharva
- Ghost
- Genius (mythology)
- Hierarchy of angels
- Holy Spirit
- In paradisum
- List of angels in theology
- List of films about angels
- Non-physical entity
- Substance theory
- Uthra
- Valkyrie
- Watcher (angel)
- Yaksha
