= Clayton School for Boys =

School in Colorado, United States

Coordinates: 39°45′45″N 104°56′35″W

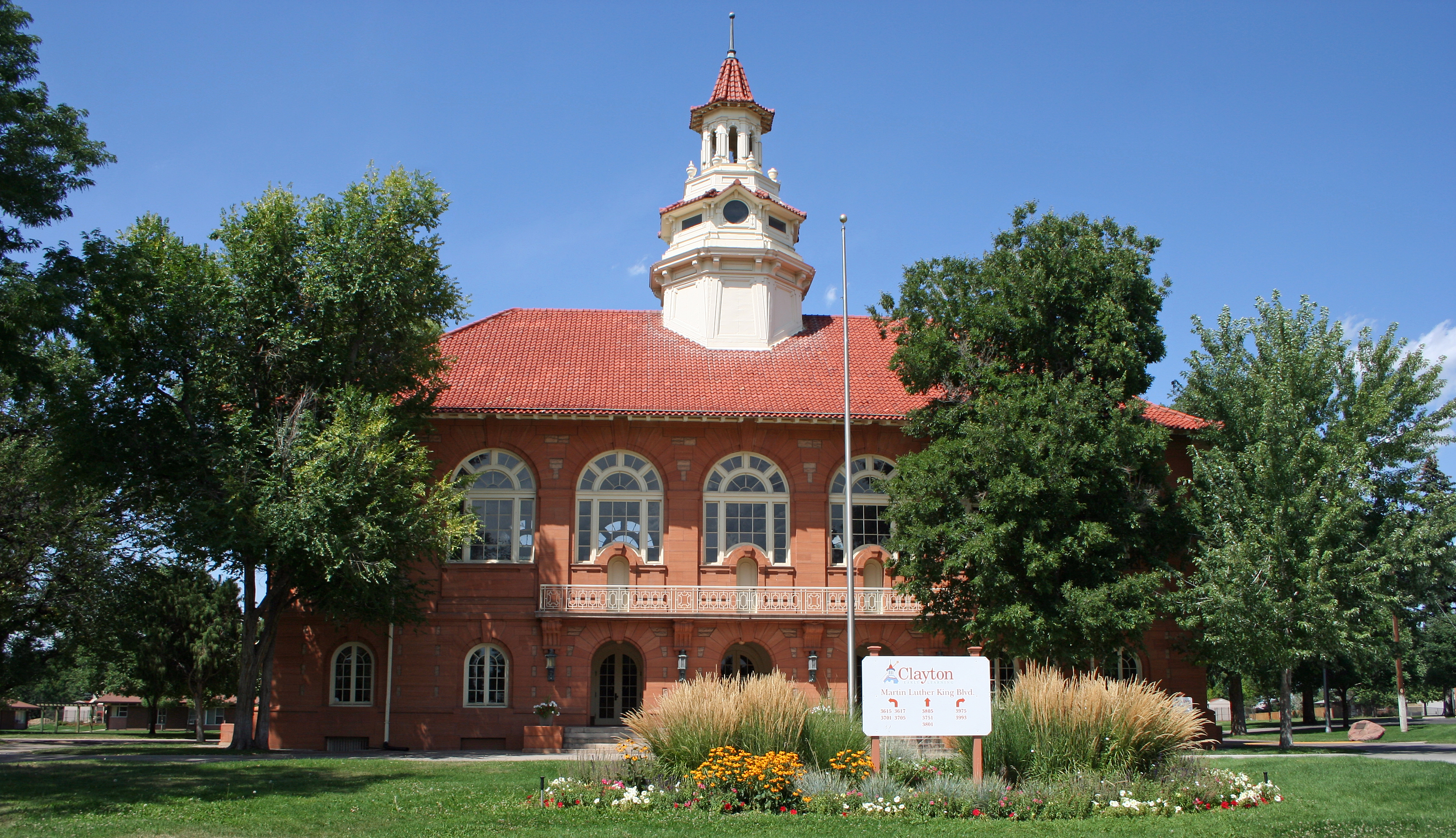
George W. Clayton Trust and College building, now Clayton Early Learning

Clayton School for Boys, established as George W. Clayton Trust & College and also known as Clayton College, was established to house and educate boys whose fathers had died and whose mothers could not provide for them. It was established in 1911 by the City of Denver from a bequest by George Washington Clayton (1833–1899), a merchant and real estate investor. The campus was designed by Biscoe & Hewitt in the Italian Renaissance Revival style and includes sandstone masonry.

The building is architecturally significant. The Denver Public Library has a collection of documents from George Washington Clayton including diaries as well as school records. Its collection also includes a photograph of the school. The building formerly housed the Black American West Museum and Heritage Center.

The college was segregated for whites only. An aerial photograph of the campus was taken in 1935. It is listed on the National Register of Historic Places (National Register of Historic Places listings in northeast Denver). Maurice B. Biscoe was the building's architect.

The college is in Clayton, Denver, a neighborhood named for George Washington Clayton. His brother William Clayton served as mayor of Denver.

== Legacy ==
=== Park Hill Golf Club ===
The Trust owned Park Hill Golf Club, formerly a dairy farm where students learned agricultural work. A conservation easement was out in place on the golf course. In 2023, the city proposed lifting the easement and proposed a redevelopment plan for the property. In January 2025, the city of Denver acquired the land.

=== Historical marker ===
A historical marker dedicated in 1999 commemorates the Clayton Trust and College.

=== Clayton Early Learning ===
The trust is now used to support Clayton Early Learning.
