= G. W. & W. M. Clayton Building =

- Granite Building
- U.S. Historic district – Contributing property
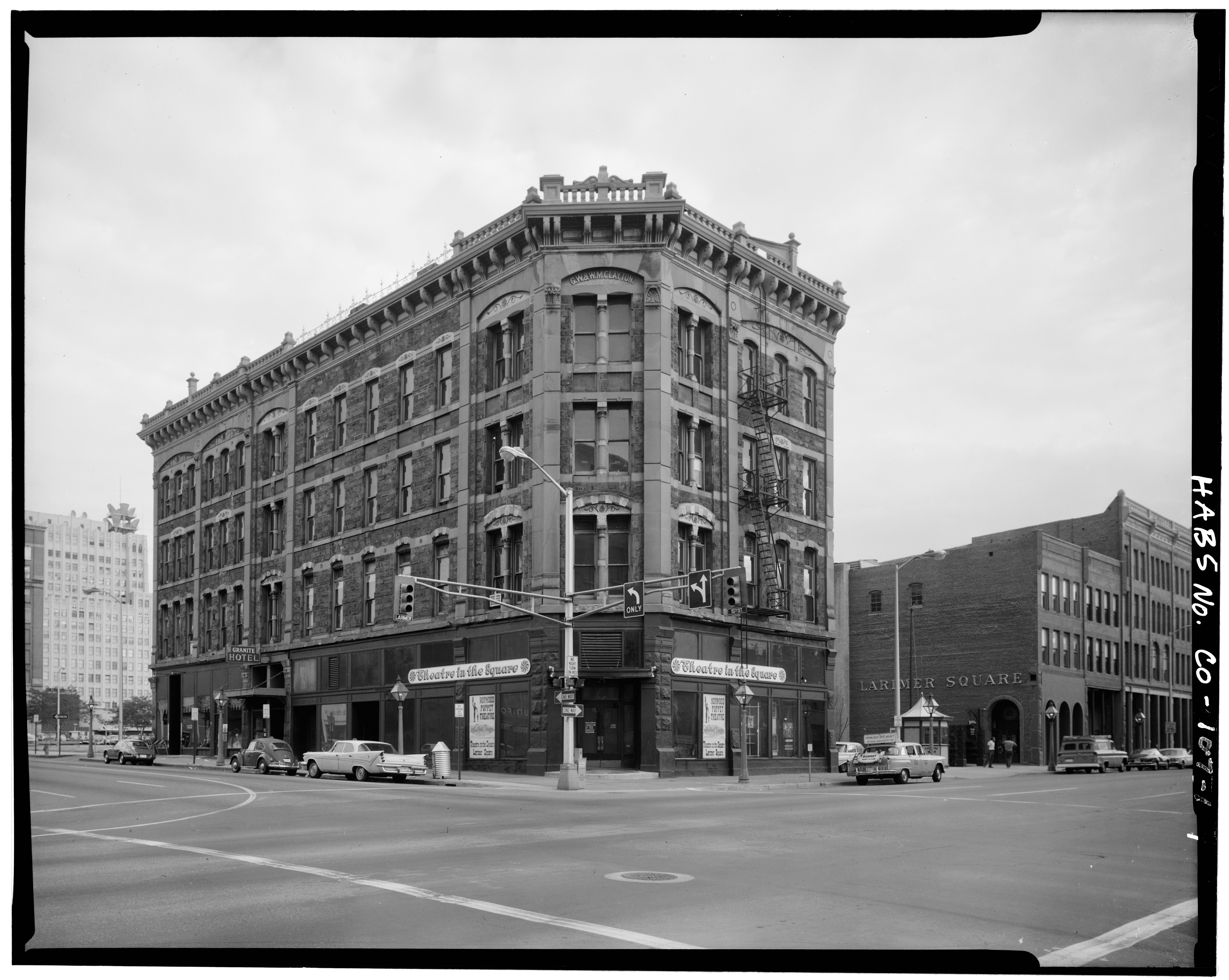
- HABS photo
- Location: 1454-60 Larimer Street, 1226-28 15th Street, Denver, Colorado
- Coordinates: 39.74795°N 104.99854°W
- Built: 1882
- Part of: Larimer Square Historic District (ID73000468)
- Designated CP: May 7, 1973

The G. W. & W. M. Clayton Building, also known as the Granite Hotel, Granite Building and the Clayton Building, is an 1882 commercial building in Denver, Colorado and is a Denver Landmark. It is a four-story building which was built in 1882 on the site of the first building in Denver, a log cabin. It was built to host the M.J. McNamara Dry Goods Company. G. W. & W. M. Clayton is inscribed near the top of the building for businessman George W. Clayton and his brother William M. Clayton, who served as mayor of Denver. The Denver Public Library has a photograph of the G. W. & W. M. Clayton Building.

It is a substantial building which eventually became a boarding house by the 1910s, and then a flophouse, however. Ownership changed in 1965 and it was restored by 1970. It held offices, restaurants, and a comedy club in its basement.

In 1969-70 it was in the Skyline Urban Renewal Area, and it was photographed by William Edmund Barrett for the Historic American Buildings Survey program.

It was designated a Denver Landmark in 1983.

It is located in the Larimer Square Historic District, which is a Denver Landmark. And it is listed on the National Register of Historic Places as a contributing building in the Larimer Square Historic District, which includes the entire 1400 block of Larimer St.; the nomination terms it the Clayton Building. It is described there as:

(Clayton Building) - In 1882 this massive and elaborate cut granite building was constructed with a large cornice hosting a filigree railing on the two street sides. Handsome cast-iron structural columns are exposed when not covered by the granite facade. Directly fronting the corner of the block is a bay front, adding an unusual dimension to the building. An interior shaft and skylight is the vent for the bathrooms. Along with the original stainglass windows this is one of the most unusual buildings on the block.
