= Henry Kernot =

English-born American author, and publisher (1806–1874)

- Born: October 20, 1806; London, England
- Died: October 21, 1874 (aged 68); New York City, United States
- Occupations: Bookseller; author; cataloguer; publisher
- Years active: 1830s–1874
- Notable work: Bibliotheca Diabolica (1874)

Henry Kernot (October 20, 1806 – October 21, 1874) was an English-born American bookseller, author, cataloguer, and publisher. He authored Bibliotheca Diabolica, an annotated bibliography of books about the devil, in 1874.

== Life and career ==
Kernot was born in London, England, to a French Huguenot family, on October 20, 1806. He began his career as a bookseller in Europe, working at shops in Soho, Covent Garden, and Dublin, before moving to the United States in 1836. Initially working at a small bookstore, he quickly became clerk and editor at Wiley and Putnam. Kernot opened his own bookstore in New York City in 1846. He later worked at D. Appleton & Company before joining Scribner, Welford and Armstrong in 1868, where he worked until his death.

Over the course of his career, Kernot wrote or acted as publisher for several books and periodicals. Beginning in 1850, he published Donald Grant Mitchell's periodical Lorgnette. In 1851, he published George Clayton Jr.'s Angelology: Remarks and Reflections. Also in 1851, he published a satirical book entitled The New Dido.

In 1874, Kernot compiled an annotated bibliography of books about the devil entitled Bibliotheca Diabolica. Despite ostensibly being a catalog for Scribner, Welford and Armstrong, the book was positively received. A brief review in The Journal of Speculative Philosophy described it as "the most complete and valuable one ever published."

His catalogue of books on the devil was illustrated with historical images and was divided into a section of serious depictions and satirical. According to a review of it, Kernot was well known among bibliophiles "for the extent and accuracy of his knowledge on books."

He died of pneumonia on October 21, 1874. He was buried at Mission Chapel in New York. Some of his correspondence is held by the New York Public Library.

== Bibliography ==
=== As publisher ===
- Lorgnette, a society pamphlet by Donald Grant Mitchell

=== As writer/editor ===
- Catalogue of English, French and American Books, a general annotated bibliography
- Bibliotheca Diabolica, a list of books about the devil
