= William M. Clayton =

American politician (1824–1892)

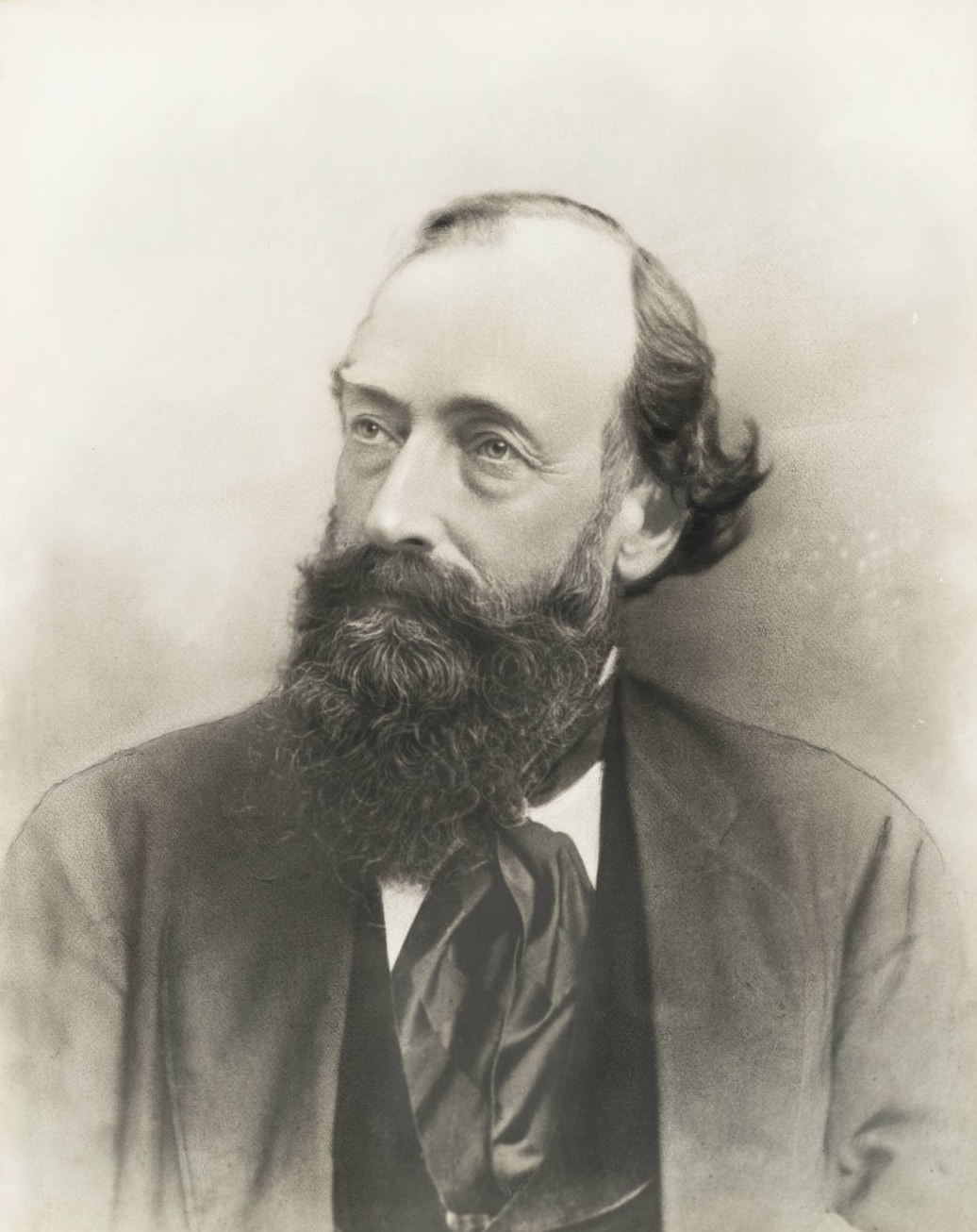
- Clayton, circa 1869

7th Mayor of Denver
- In office 1868–1869
- Preceded by: Milton DeLano
- Succeeded by: Baxter B. Stiles

Personal details
- Born: April 24, 1824 Philadelphia, Pennsylvania, U.S.
- Died: 1892 (aged 67–68)

William M. Clayton (April 24, 1824 – 1892) was an American politician. He moved to Denver with his brother, George W. Clayton, in 1859. He served as mayor of Denver, Colorado from 1868 to 1869. He died in 1892.

The G. W. & W. M. Clayton Building is a Denver Landmark.
