= George Clayton (writer) =

George Clayton Jr. was an American writer, whose sole legacy appears to be Angelology: Remarks and Reflections Touching the Agency and Ministration of Holy Angels (New York: Henry Kernot, 1851), with original illustrations and dedicated to a departed George C. Morgan.

The book received a negative review in the Literary Gazette, revealing nothing about its author.
