= Arcis Golf =

American golf course owner and operator

- Founded: 2014
- Founder: Blake Walker
- Headquarters: Dallas, Texas
- Key people: Blake Walker (CEO)
- Website: arcisgolf.com

Arcis Golf is an American golf course owner and management company based in Texas. As of 2025 it is the second-largest golf course operator in the United States.

== History ==
Arcis Golf was founded in 2014 by Blake Walker as a subscription golf service. The company is backed by Arcis Equity Partners, a firm also owned by Walker, and purchased 46 golf courses from CNL Lifestyle Properties at a cost of $306 million in 2014. In 2021, it purchased six properties from Mickelson Golf Properties and at the time owned 60 gold clubs in 14 states. The same year it entered into an agreement to operate its first international golf course at Kilada Country Club in Greece.

By 2023 it was the second largest owners and operator of golf facilities in the United States, and by 2024 it had purchased approximately 70 golf clubs and employed 6,000 people. It entered into a marketing agreement with the LPGA in 2025, allowing players of the tour to train and play for free at courses within the Arcis portfolio. The same year it was valued at $2 billion.

== Courses ==
Arcis golf provides subscription based golf services which include daily-fee courses and private country clubs.
