= George W. Clayton =

American businessman (1883–1915)

George Washington Clayton (February 22, 1833 - August 15, 1889) was a businessman and philanthropist who left most of his estate to found the Clayton School for Boys in Denver, Colorado. He stipulated it was to be only for white children of good character who were born in Colorado.

The neighborhood of Clayton in Denver is named for him. Clayton owned a dairy farm that became Park Hill Golf Club. Students at the orphanage did agricultural pursuits at the farm.

== Life ==
Clayton was born on February 22, 1833, in Philadelphia. Growing up, he worked in his father's store in the city. In 1859, he and his brother William M. Clayton moved to Denver to open a store.

The city had only been platted one year earlier and the Clayton's store initially occupied city founder William Larimer's original cabin. Several years later, the Clayton's tore down the structure and built a larger brick building in its place which was eventually rented to McNamara Dry Goods Company, predecessor of The Denver Dry Goods Company. The leasing of the building was part of Clayton's broader attempts to branch into real estate.

Clayton purchased land around Denver, becoming the cities most prolific property owner. In 1882 he constructed a four-story building at the site of his store. The G. W. & W. M. Clayton Building later housed the Granite Hotel and became known as the Granite Building.

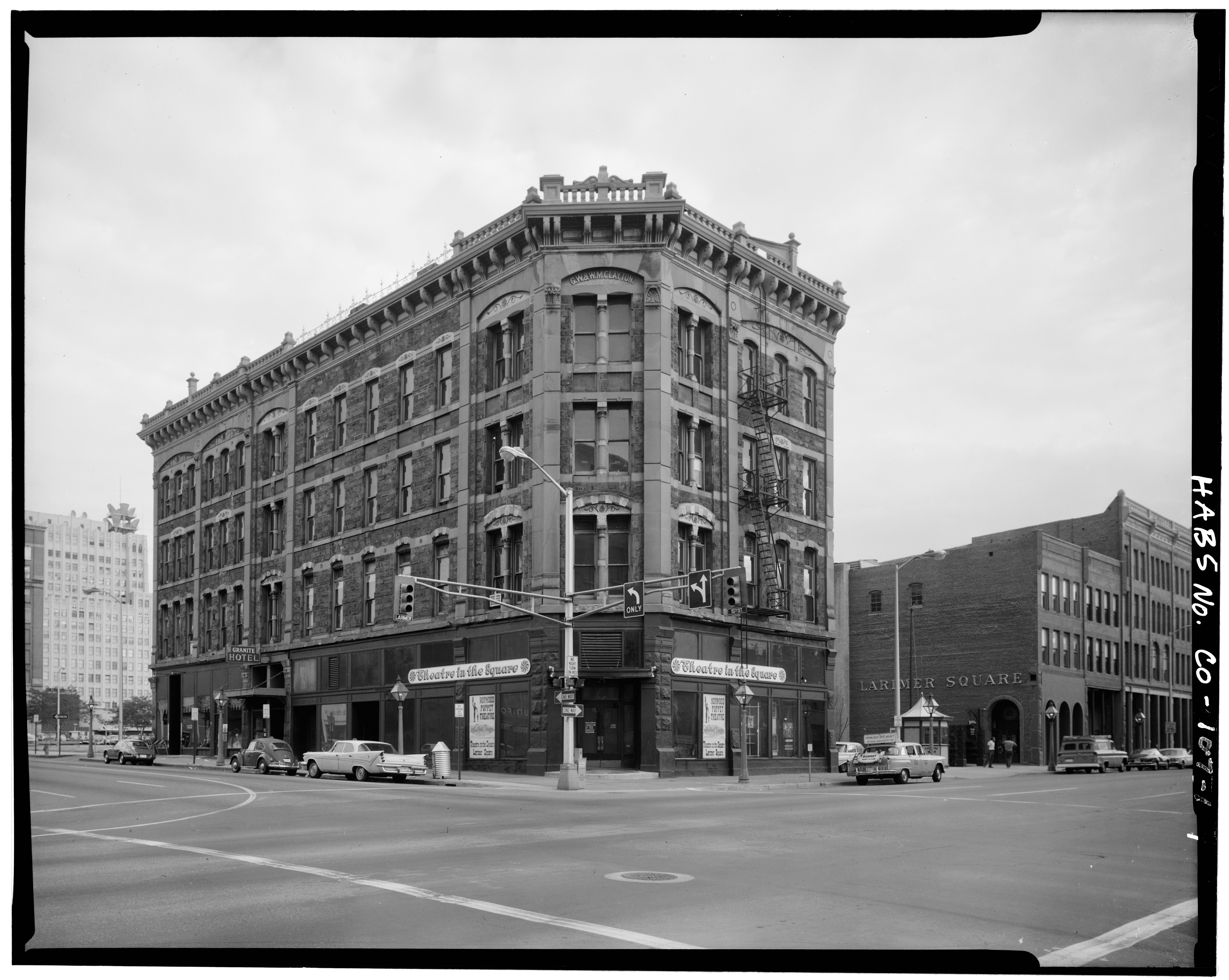
G. W. & W. M. Clayton Building in Denver

Clayton and his brother William both entered local politics quickly. Clayton was elected to the Denver City Council in 1861 and also served on the Arapahoe County Board of Commissioners, while William became Denver's 7th mayor in 1868.

Clayton married his wife, Letita Myers, in 1860. While they had a son together in 1861, both his son and wife died within the year. Clayton did not remarry. He died on August 15, 1889, in his office at the Granite Building. His obituary, published in The Denver Post, described him as "a man who never appeared in print if he could avoid it but did anonymous acts of kindness."

== Estate and orphanage ==
Much of Clayton's estate, valued at more than $2,000,000 (equivalent to $77,400,000 in 2025), was left to found a tuition-free school for orphaned boys. The school was to be run by a trust led by the Governor of Colorado and the Chief Justice of the Colorado Supreme Court, among others. The school was modeled after Philadelphia's Girard College.

Relatives of Clayton quickly contested the legitimacy of the will. A trial was held on December 12, 1900, at which the challengers argued that the city of Denver was legally incapable of accepting money from a person's estate. In March of 1901, the judge upheld the will's legitimacy and the governor signed legislation on March 25 formally allowing Denver to accept bequests. The decision was appealed to the Colorado Supreme Court in October of 1901 by Thomas Clayton, Clayton's brother. Dissatisfied with his bequested $600 a year (equivalent to $23,220 in 2025), he introduced a variety of new legal arguments. Among others, he claimed that Clayton was not motivated by generosity, but by "a desire simply to perpetuate his name." On July 1, 1902, the Supreme Court ruled in the estate's favor, determining that the will was valid. Moses Hallett was named the will's executor and charged with creating the school.

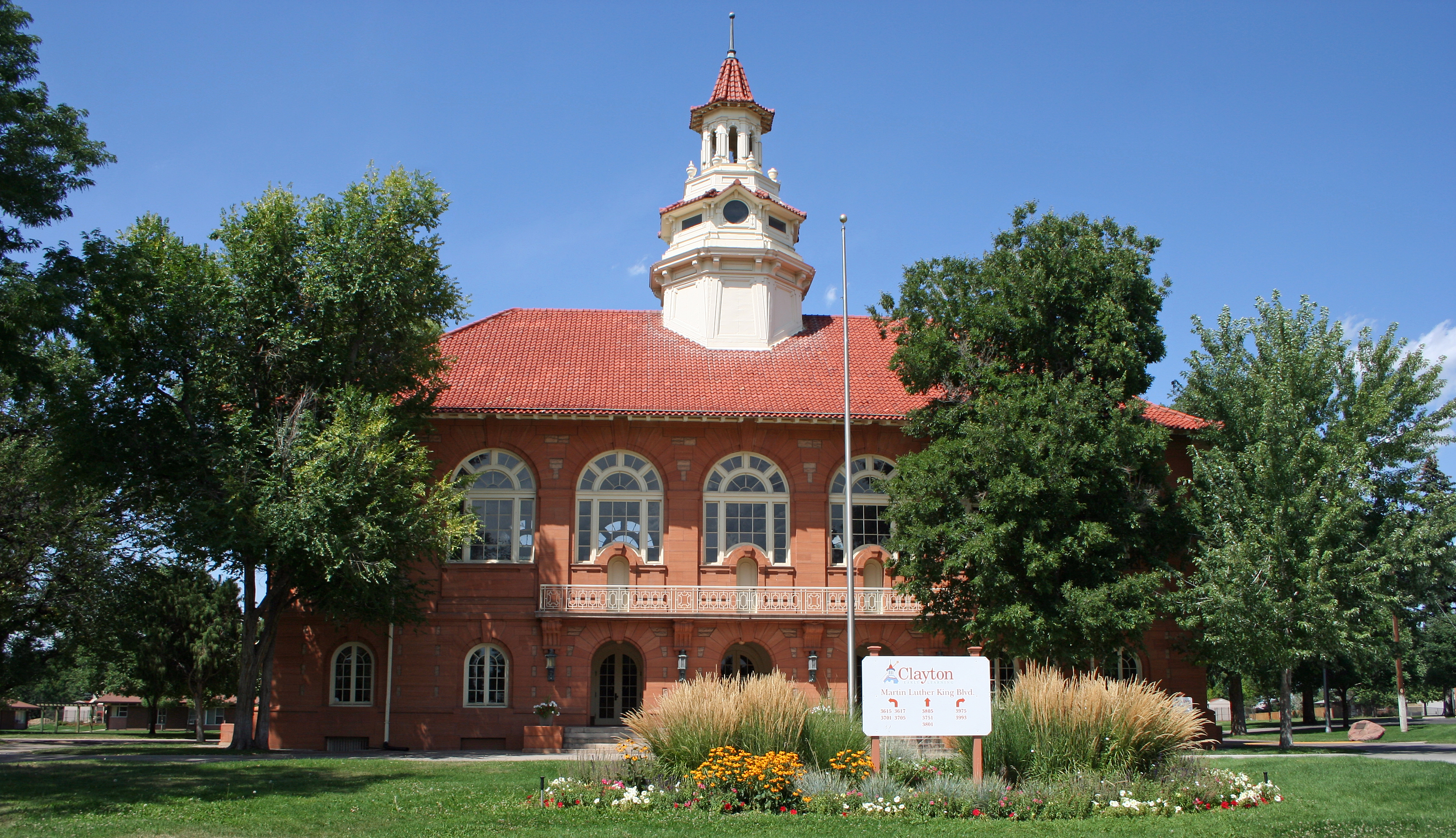
George W. Clayton Trust and College building, now Clayton Early Learning

In 1903, Hallett was accused of mismanaging the estate and sued by Mary Lathrop, who alleged that he had used estate funds for his own purposes and had illegally paid himself from the estate. Lathrop lost her case in both the District Court and the Court of Appeals. Construction of the school was finally initiated in 1908. The estate was turned over to the City of Denver in 1910 and the school was formally incorporated in 1911. The school closed in 1957, however, the Clayton Trust continued to issue grants for various education projects through at least 1986. After 1986, the trust was reorganized as the Clayton Foundation, which occupies the campus as an early childhood learning facility (Clayton Early Learning).

== Legacy ==
A historical marker dedicated in 1999 commemorates the Clayton Trust. The orphanage is listed on the National Register of Historic Places (National Register of Historic Places listings in northeast Denver) as George W. Clayton Trust and College. The building was designed by architects Biscoe & Hewitt.

Control of the trust was the subject of investigative reports and allegations of mismanagement by the city including improper land dealings. The city ceded control of the college in 1982. Denver Public Library has a collection of papers from George W. Clayton and the college.
