= National Register of Historic Places listings in northeast Denver =

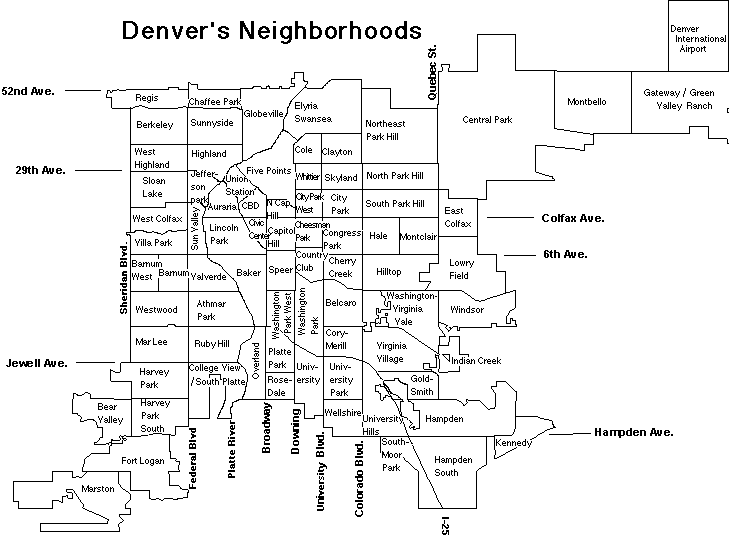
The 78 official neighborhoods of the City and County of Denver.

This is a list of the National Register of Historic Places listings in Northeast Denver, Colorado.

This is intended to be a complete list of the properties and districts on the National Register of Historic Places in northeastern Denver, Colorado, United States. Northeast Denver is defined as being all of the city east of the Platte River north of Sixth Avenue, excluding the downtown neighborhoods of Capitol Hill, Central Business District, Civic Center, Five Points, North Capitol Hill, and Union Station. The locations of National Register properties and districts may be seen in an online map.

There are more than 300 properties and districts listed on the National Register in Denver. Northeast Denver includes 76 of these properties and districts, including 4 that extend into other regions; the city's remaining properties and districts are listed elsewhere. Another property in Northeast Denver was listed but has been removed.

This National Park Service list is complete through NPS recent listings posted August 28, 2026.

== Current listings ==
	Name on the Register	Image	Date listed	Location	Neighborhood	Description
1	Altamaha Apartments	Altamaha Apartments	May 5, 2004 (#04000382)	1490 Lafayette St. 39°44′23″N 104°58′14″W	Cheesman Park	Built in 1902, designed by George L. Bettcher.
2	Annunciation Church	Annunciation Church	June 21, 1990 (#90000869)	3601 Humboldt St. 39°46′02″N 104°58′11″W	Cole	
3	Auraria 9th Street Historic District	Auraria 9th Street Historic District	March 26, 1973 (#73000466)	9th St. from Curtis to Champa St. 39°44′30″N 105°00′12″W	Auraria	
4	Austin Building	Austin Building	January 11, 1996 (#95001512)	2400–2418 E. Colfax and 1472 Josephine St. 39°44′24″N 104°57′28″W	Congress Park	
5	Bastien's Restaurant	Bastien's Restaurant	September 30, 2009 (#09000774)	3503 E. Colfax Ave. 39°44′26″N 104°56′46″W	City Park	
6	Bats Grocery Store	Bats Grocery Store	January 28, 1988 (#87002545)	4336 Clayton St. 39°46′37″N 104°57′12″W	Elyria Swansea	
7	Bluebird Theater	Bluebird Theater	January 31, 1997 (#97000018)	3315–3317 E. Colfax Ave. 39°44′26″N 104°56′52″W	City Park	
8	Bonfils Memorial Theatre	Bonfils Memorial Theatre	December 27, 2006 (#91001417)	1475 Elizabeth St. 39°44′24″N 104°57′21″W	Congress Park	
9	Richard Crawford Campbell House	Richard Crawford Campbell House	July 3, 1979 (#79000578)	909 York St. 39°43′51″N 104°57′35″W	Cheesman Park	
10	Delos Allen Chappell House	Delos Allen Chappell House	June 3, 1982 (#82002293)	1555 Race St. 39°44′28″N 104°57′47″W	City Park West	
11	Cheesman Park	Cheesman Park	September 17, 1986 (#86002221)	Roughly bounded by E. 13th Ave., High St., E. 8th Ave., and Franklin St. 39°43′58″N 104°57′57″W	Cheesman Park	
12	City Park	City Park	September 17, 1986 (#86002190)	Roughly bounded by E. 23rd Ave., Colorado Boulevard, E. 17th Ave., and York St. 39°44′50″N 104°56′59″W	City Park	
13	City Park Esplanade	City Park Esplanade	September 17, 1986 (#86002177)	City Park Esplanade from E. Colfax Ave. to E. 17th Ave. 39°44′31″N 104°57′22″W	City Park	
14	City Park Golf	City Park Golf	September 17, 1986 (#86002198)	Roughly bounded by E. 26th Ave., Colorado Boulevard, E. 23rd Ave., and York St. 39°45′10″N 104°57′00″W	Skyland	
15	George W. Clayton Trust and College	George W. Clayton Trust and College	May 2, 2006 (#06000329)	3801 Martin Luther King Boulevard; 39°45′46″N 104°56′34″W	Clayton	
16	Cole Neighborhood Historic District	Cole Neighborhood Historic District	March 31, 1995 (#95000264)	3200–3300 Vine and Race Sts. 39°45′48″N 104°57′45″W	Cole	
17	Colorado Woman's College	Colorado Woman's College	August 10, 1978 (#78000855)	7110, 7150, 7190, 7196 Montview Blvd.; 1740, 1790, 1800 Pontiac St. 39°44′44″N 104°54′15″W	South Park Hill	Boundary increase and name change approved March 21, 2023; formerly listed as "Treat Hall".
18	Denver Medical Depot	Denver Medical Depot	June 3, 1998 (#98000650)	3800 York St. 39°46′13″N 104°57′15″W	Clayton	
19	Denver Orphans' Home	Denver Orphans' Home	January 15, 1999 (#98001606)	1501 Albion St. 39°44′27″N 104°56′20″W	South Park Hill	
20	Dow–Rosenzweig House	Dow–Rosenzweig House	June 3, 1982 (#82002294)	1129 E. 17th Ave. 39°44′37″N 104°58′20″W	City Park West	
21	Doyle–Benton House	Doyle–Benton House	January 18, 2006 (#05001527)	1301 Lafayette St. 39°44′13″N 104°58′13″W	Cheesman Park	
22	East High School	East High School	July 27, 2006 (#06000660)	1545 Detroit St. 39°44′32″N 104°57′19″W	City Park	
23	East Sixth Avenue Parkway	East Sixth Avenue Parkway	September 17, 1986 (#86002214)	E. 6th Ave. Parkway from Colorado Boulevard to Quebec St. 39°43′07″N 104°55′38″W	Hale and Montclair	Extends into Hilltop in Southeast Denver
24	East Seventh Avenue Parkway	East Seventh Avenue Parkway	September 17, 1986 (#86002217)	E. 7th Ave. Parkway from Williams St. to Colorado Boulevard; 39°43′37″N 104°57′06″W	Country Club and Congress Park	
25	East Seventeenth Avenue Parkway	East Seventeenth Avenue Parkway	September 17, 1986 (#86002200)	E. 17th Ave. Parkway from Colorado Boulevard to the Monaco St. Parkway; 39°44′36″N 104°55′35″W	South Park Hill	
26	Emmanuel Shearith Israel Chapel	Emmanuel Shearith Israel Chapel	December 1, 1969 (#69000041)	1201 10th St. 39°44′39″N 105°00′12″W	Auraria	
27	First Unitarian Society of Denver	First Unitarian Society of Denver	July 14, 2017 (#100001308)	1400 Lafayette St. 39°44′19″N 104°58′13″W	City Park West	
28	Forest Street Parkway	Forest Street Parkway	September 17, 1986 (#86002203)	Forest St. Parkway from 17th Ave. to Montview Boulevard; 39°44′44″N 104°55′36″W	South Park Hill	
29	Ernest LeNeve Foster House	Ernest LeNeve Foster House	September 4, 1980 (#80000891)	2105 Lafayette St. 39°44′54″N 104°58′14″W	City Park West	
30	Fountain Inn	Fountain Inn	July 27, 2020 (#100005378)	3015 East Colfax Ave. 39°44′25″N 104°57′07″W		
31	Russell and Elinor Gates Mansion	Russell and Elinor Gates Mansion	March 7, 2002 (#02000152)	1365–1375 Josephine; 39°44′17″N 104°57′30″W	Congress Park	
32	House at 1750 Gilpin Street	House at 1750 Gilpin Street	July 7, 2004 (#04000661)	1750 Gilpin St. 39°44′39″N 104°57′59″W	City Park West	
33	Humboldt Street Historic District	Humboldt Street Historic District	December 29, 1978 (#78000848)	Humboldt St. between E. 10th and E. 12th Sts. 39°44′01″N 104°58′07″W	Cheesman Park	
34	La Vista Motel	La Vista Motel	April 7, 2025 (#100011602)	5500 East Colfax Avenue; 39°44′24″N 104°55′23″W	Hale	
35	Owen E. LeFevre House	Owen E. LeFevre House	August 13, 1976 (#76000552)	1311 York St. 39°44′14″N 104°57′35″W	Cheesman Park	
36	Livestock Exchange Building	Livestock Exchange Building	March 20, 2025 (#100011550)	4701 Marion Street; 39°46′58″N 104°58′20″W		
37	Macedonia Baptist Church	Macedonia Baptist Church	April 6, 2015 (#15000125)	3240 Adams St. 39°45′44″N 104°56′55″W	Clayton	
38	Peter McCourt House	Peter McCourt House	May 9, 1983 (#83001313)	1471 High St. 39°44′24″N 104°57′51″W	Cheesman Park	
39	Midwest Steel and Iron Works Company Complex	Midwest Steel and Iron Works Company Complex	April 10, 1985 (#85000858)	25 Larimer St. 39°44′27″N 105°00′55″W	Lincoln Park	
40	J. Warner Mills House	J. Warner Mills House	July 18, 2024 (#100010539)	2350 N. Gilpin Street; 39°45′06″N 104°58′02″W	Whittier	
41	Monaco Street Parkway	Monaco Street Parkway	September 17, 1986 (#86002207)	Monaco St. Parkway from E. 1st Ave. to Montview Boulevard; 39°43′58″N 104°54′43″W	Montclair and South Park Hill	Extends into Hilltop in Southeast Denver
42	Montclair Park	Montclair Park	September 17, 1986 (#86002213)	Roughly bounded by E. 12th Ave., Onieda St., and the Richthofen Parkway; 39°44′06″N 104°54′30″W	Montclair	
43	Montview Boulevard	Montview Boulevard	October 1, 1986 (#86002205)	Montview Boulevard from Colorado Boulevard to Monaco St. Parkway; 39°44′51″N 104°55′36″W	South Park Hill	
44	Montview Boulevard Presbyterian Church	Montview Boulevard Presbyterian Church	April 6, 2004 (#04000262)	1980 Dahlia St. 39°44′49″N 104°55′52″W	South Park Hill	
45	Motor Coach Division Building–Denver Tramway Company	Motor Coach Division Building–Denver Tramway Company	December 17, 1998 (#98001517)	3500 Gilpin St. 39°46′00″N 104°58′02″W	Cole	
46	The Owl Club of Denver	The Owl Club of Denver	November 14, 2024 (#100011062)	2815 Madison Street; 39°45′26″N 104°56′48″W	Skyland	
47	Park Hill	Park Hill	December 16, 2004 (#04001348)	Bounded by Colorado Boulevard, E. 26th Ave., Dahlia St., and E. Montview Boulevard; 39°45′04″N 104°56′09″W	North Park Hill and South Park Hill	
48	Pearce–McAllister Cottage	Pearce–McAllister Cottage	June 20, 1972 (#72000271)	1880 Gaylord St. 39°44′46″N 104°57′37″W	City Park West	
49	Peoples Presbyterian Church	Peoples Presbyterian Church	July 18, 2016 (#16000448)	2780 York St. 39°45′25″N 104°57′35″W	Skyland	
50	Wilbur S. Raymond House	Wilbur S. Raymond House	November 21, 1974 (#74000570)	1572 Race St. 39°44′29″N 104°57′54″W	City Park West	
51	Richthofen Castle	Richthofen Castle	April 21, 1975 (#75000511)	7020 E. 12th Ave. 39°44′07″N 104°54′22″W	Montclair	
52	Richthofen Monument	Richthofen Monument	September 17, 1986 (#86002212)	Richthofen Parkway at Oneida St. 39°44′03″N 104°54′27″W	Montclair	
53	Richthofen Place Parkway	Richthofen Place Parkway	September 17, 1986 (#86002209)	Richthofen Pl. Parkway from the Monaco St. Parkway to Oneida St. 39°44′03″N 104°54′32″W	Montclair	
54	Riverside Cemetery	Riverside Cemetery	October 28, 1994 (#94001253)	5201 Brighton Boulevard; 39°47′39″N 104°57′33″W	Elyria-Swansea	Extends into North Washington in Adams County
55	Robinson House	Robinson House	February 12, 2003 (#03000003)	3435 Albion St. 39°45′55″N 104°56′20″W	Northeast Park Hill	
56	St. Elizabeth's Church	St. Elizabeth's Church	December 1, 1969 (#69000043)	1062 11th St. 39°44′34″N 105°00′06″W	Auraria	
57	St. Ignatius Loyola Church	St. Ignatius Loyola Church	December 23, 1994 (#94001468)	Junction of E. 23rd Ave. and York St. 39°45′05″N 104°57′35″W	Whittier	
58	St. Joseph's Roman Catholic Church of Denver	St. Joseph's Roman Catholic Church of Denver	June 3, 1982 (#82002295)	600 Galapago; 39°43′34″N 104°59′44″W	Lincoln Park	
59	Saint Philomena Catholic Parish School	Saint Philomena Catholic Parish School	May 4, 2011 (#11000239)	940 Fillmore St. 39°43′54″N 104°57′08″W	Congress Park	
60	Schlessinger House	Schlessinger House	November 14, 1979 (#79000591)	1544 Race St. 39°44′28″N 104°57′46″W	City Park West	
61	Smith House	Smith House	September 26, 1985 (#85002566)	1801 York St. 39°44′42″N 104°57′35″W	City Park West	
62	Milo A. Smith House	Milo A. Smith House	July 3, 1997 (#97000658)	1360 Birch St. 39°44′15″N 104°56′09″W	Hale	
63	Pierce T. Smith House	Pierce T. Smith House	September 20, 1984 (#84000823)	1751 Gilpin St. 39°44′40″N 104°58′01″W	City Park West	
64	South Platte River Bridges	South Platte River Bridges	October 15, 2002 (#02001128)	Interstate 25 at milepost 210.53; 39°44′36″N 105°00′56″W	Auraria	Extends into Jefferson Park and Sun Valley in West Denver
65	Speer Boulevard	Speer Boulevard	September 17, 1986 (#86002240)	Speer Boulevard from W. Colfax Ave. to Downing St. 39°43′42″N 104°59′09″W	Lincoln Park	Extends into Civic Center in Downtown Denver and Speer in Southeast Denver
66	Stanley Arms	Stanley Arms	July 15, 1999 (#99000823)	1321–1333 E. 10th Ave. 39°43′57″N 104°58′13″W	Cheesman Park	
67	Stanley School–Montclair School	Stanley School–Montclair School	February 13, 2007 (#07000038)	1301 Quebec St. 39°44′15″N 104°54′12″W	Montclair	Now used as a private preschool.
68	Sunken Gardens	Sunken Gardens	September 17, 1986 (#86002247)	Roughly bounded by Speer Boulevard, W. 8th Ave., Delaware, and Elati Sts. 39°43′49″N 104°59′30″W	Lincoln Park	
69	Tears–McFarlane House	Tears–McFarlane House	January 11, 1976 (#76000557)	1290 Williams St. 39°44′12″N 104°57′56″W	Cheesman Park	
70	Tivoli Brewery Company	Tivoli Brewery Company	April 11, 1973 (#73000469)	1320–1348 10th St. 39°44′43″N 105°00′17″W	Auraria	
71	Vine Street Houses	Vine Street Houses	December 16, 1974 (#74000572)	1415, 1429, 1435, 1441, and 1453 Vine St. 39°44′21″N 104°58′01″W	Cheesman Park	
72	Manuella C. Walters Duplex	Manuella C. Walters Duplex	September 30, 2009 (#09000775)	1728 and 1732 Gilpin St. 39°44′38″N 104°58′02″W	City Park West	
73	West Side Court Building	West Side Court Building	May 5, 2004 (#04000383)	924 W. Colfax Ave. 39°44′23″N 104°59′57″W	Lincoln Park	
74	Westside Neighborhood	Westside Neighborhood	April 17, 1975 (#75000516)	1311–1466 Lipan St., 1305–1370 Kalamath St., 931–1126 W. 14th Ave., 1312–1438 Maraposa St., and 1008–1118 W. 13th Ave. 39°44′17″N 105°00′08″W	Lincoln Park	
75	Zall House	Zall House	November 9, 2005 (#05001207)	5401 E. 6th Ave. Parkway; 39°43′33″N 104°55′27″W	Hale	
76	Zeitz Buckhorn Exchange	Zeitz Buckhorn Exchange	April 21, 1983 (#83001292)	1000 Osage St. 39°43′56″N 105°00′58″W	Lincoln Park	

== Former listing ==
	Name on the Register	Image	Date listed	Date removed	Location	City or town	Description
1	Beierle Farm	Beierle Farm	December 23, 1992 (#92001673)	November 7, 2007	Hudson Rd. north of Irondale Rd., near Watkins; 39°51′49″N 104°37′15″W	Airport	Delisted on November 7, 2007 after demolition.

== See also ==
- List of National Register of Historic Places in Colorado
- List of National Register of Historic Places in Denver
- List of National Register of Historic Places in downtown Denver
- List of National Register of Historic Places in southeast Denver
- List of National Register of Historic Places in west Denver
- List of National Historic Landmarks in Colorado
- Bibliography of Colorado
- Geography of Colorado
- History of Colorado
- Index of Colorado-related articles
- List of Colorado-related lists
- Outline of Colorado
