= Clayton, Denver =

Neighborhood in Denver, Colorado, United States

Coordinates: 39.7670°N 104.9499°W

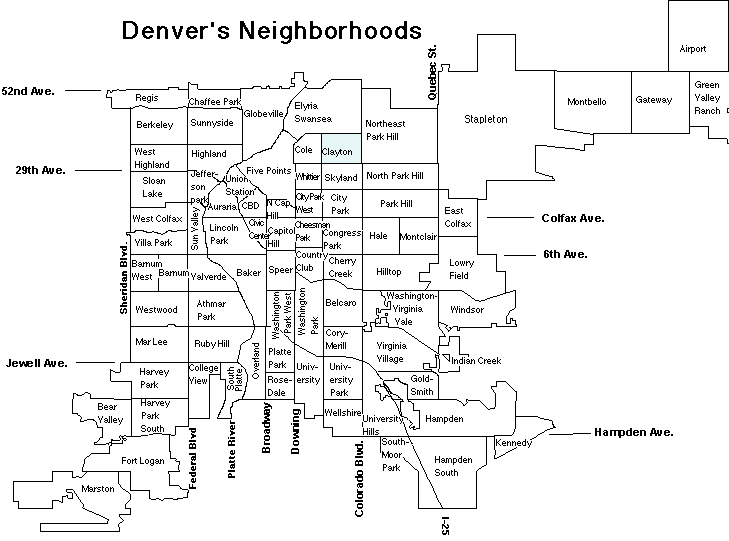
Clayton (highlighted) on a map of Denver neighborhoods

Clayton is a neighborhood located in the city and county of Denver, Colorado. Often confused with Park Hill, Cole, or the City Park neighborhoods, Clayton is a distinct neighborhood as defined by the city of Denver. The neighborhood is named for the historical former George W. Clayton Trust and College located on the northwest corner of Martin Luther King Blvd. and Colorado Blvd. This college has been listed on the National Register of Historic Places.

== Geography ==
Clayton is bounded by York Street on the west, Colorado Blvd. on the east, Martin Luther King Blvd on the south and 40th Avenue on the north.

== Landmarks and parks ==
- George W. Clayton Trust and College (former): Located on the northwest corner of Martin Luther King Blvd. and Colorado Blvd. This former college has been listed on the National Register of Historic Places.
- Denver Medical Depot: Located at 3800 York St. Also listed on the National Register of Historic Places.
- The City of Nairobi Park: Located at East 36th Avenue and Cook Street. Being named after Nairobi, Kenya is one of Denver's "Sister City" parks.
- Schafer Park: Located on East 37th Avenue
- Schafer (Martin J) Park: Located at 3724 N Columbine St.
- Denver Fire Station #10: Located at 3200 N Steele St.
- Eastside Human Services Building: Located at 3815 Steele St.

== See also ==
- Bibliography of Colorado
- Geography of Colorado
- History of Colorado
- Index of Colorado-related articles
- List of Colorado-related lists
  - List of neighborhoods in Denver
  - List of populated places in Colorado
- Outline of Colorado
