= City Park, Denver =

Park and neighborhood of Denver, Colorado, United States

- City Park
- U.S. National Register of Historic Places
- U.S. Historic district
- Colorado State Register of Historic Properties
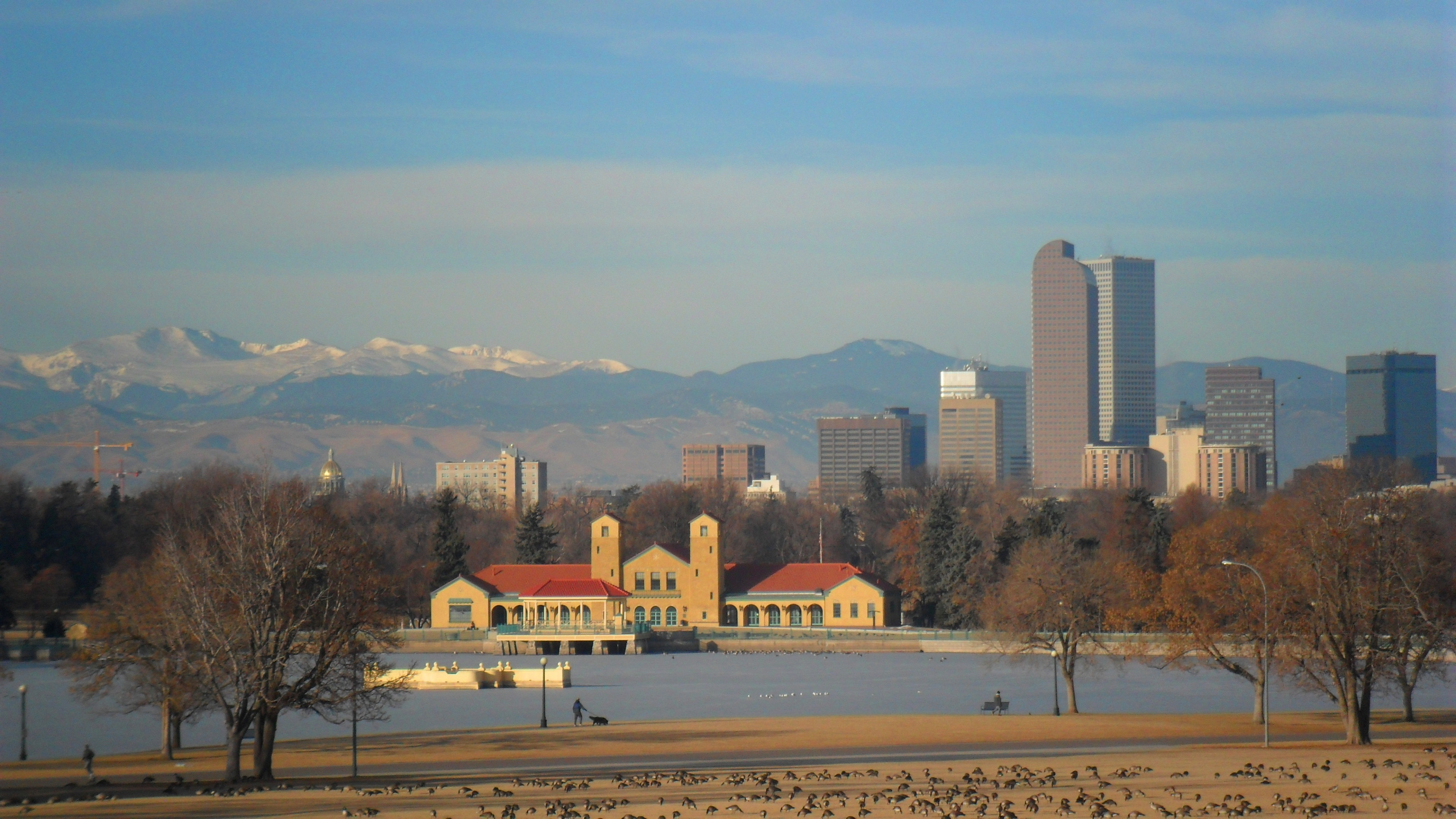
- The Denver skyline from City Park in January
- Interactive map showing the location of City Park
- Location: Denver, Colorado
- Coordinates: 39°44′50″N 104°57′02″W
- Area: 330 acres (1.3 km^{2})
- Built: 1880
- Architect: Meryweather, Henry F.; DeBoer, S.R.
- Architectural style: Classical Revival, Renaissance, Shingle Style
- MPS: Denver Park and Parkway System TR
- NRHP reference No.: 86002190
- CSRHP No.: 5DV.50
- Added to NRHP: September 17, 1986

City Park is an urban park and neighborhood in Denver, Colorado. The park is 330 acres (1.3 km^{2}) and is located in east-central Denver. The park contains the Denver Zoo, the Denver Museum of Nature and Science, Ferril and Duck Lakes, and a boathouse. City Park is also the name of the neighborhood that contains the park, though the park is the vast majority of the neighborhood. To the immediate north of the park is the City Park Golf Course. City Park is the largest park in Denver.

== Geography ==
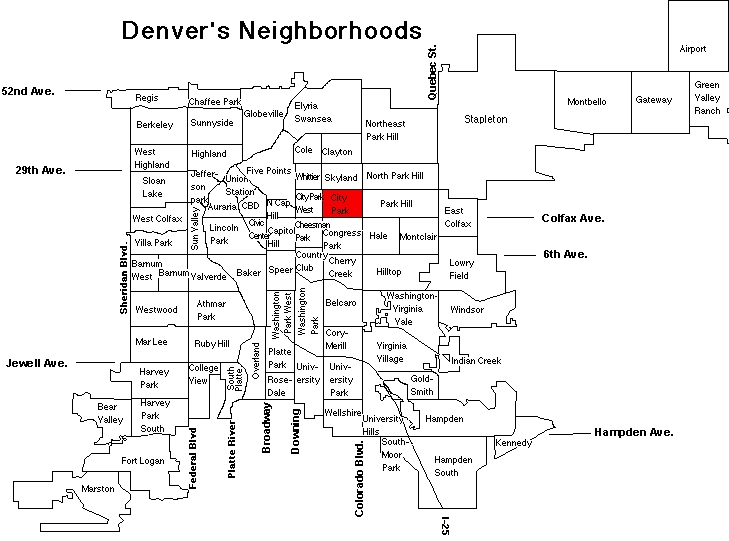
The City Park neighborhood highlighted on this map of Denver's neighborhoods

The park is located in east-central Denver slightly more than a mile east of downtown. The park is a mile long and three-quarters of a mile wide. The park's boundaries are:

- West-York Street
- South-17th Avenue
- East-Colorado Boulevard
- North-23rd Avenue.

The City Park neighborhood has the same boundaries except for having Colfax Avenue as its southern boundary, which is two blocks south of 17th Avenue. Therefore, the entirety of the neighborhood is only two blocks wide, but about a mile long. The area in the southwest corner of the neighborhood consists of East High School and a green area called the City Park Esplanade, which in some ways extends the park south two blocks to Colfax Avenue. The eastern part of the neighborhood around Colfax Avenue (along with parts of the Congress Park neighborhood across Colfax) is also known as the "Bluebird District", for the Bluebird Theatre located on Colfax and the urban developments around that area. There is also a neighborhood called "City Park West", which is located just west of the park to Downing Street and commonly known as Uptown. It has the same southern and northern borders as City Park, and has York Street as its eastern border.

== History ==
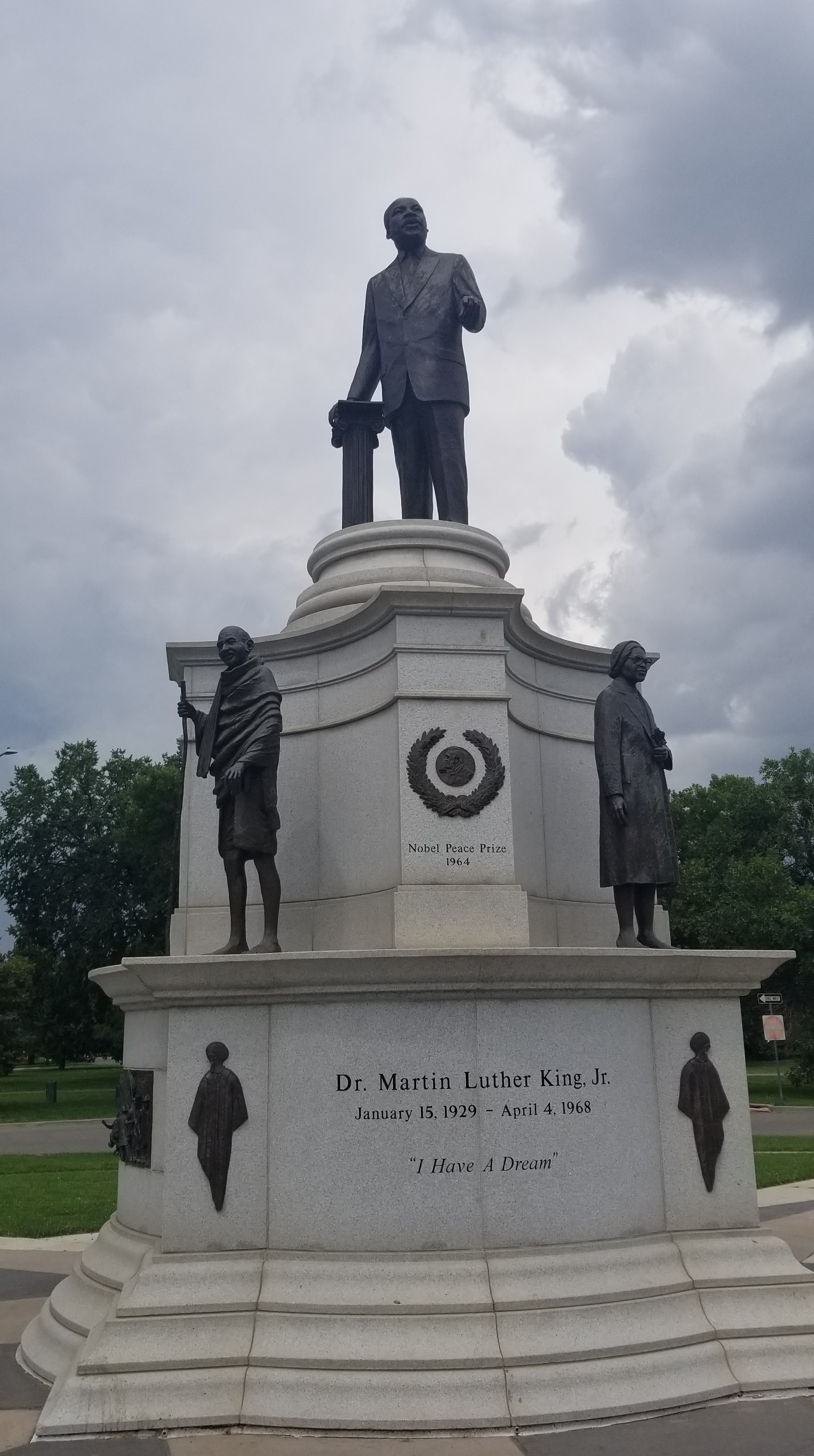
Martin Luther King Jr. statue in City Park, Denver

When Denver was founded in 1858, it was little more than a mining camp. By the 1870s however, Denver had gained a substantial permanent population, and many residents were clamoring for parks. In 1878, the Colorado state legislature passed a bill to allow Denver to acquire 1,280 acres (5.2 km^{2}) of state land to build parks. City Park became the largest tract turned into a park. The initial park layout was designed by Henry Meryweather in 1882 in the tradition of both English pastoral gardens and Central Park in New York City with a flowing, casual design. The 1893 World's Fair started the City Beautiful movement, which further developed the design. The park was irrigated with water from the city ditch.

City Park is also one of the oldest public spaces in Denver. The park grew out of the social and cultural atmosphere of the late 19th century as Denver residents, business-owners, garden clubs and politicians rallied for the improvement of the dry and dusty Queen City of the Plains. The idea of an “east city park” linked to a “west city park” by a chain of tree-lined parkways first emerged in 1878. In 1882 Henry Meryweather prepared the park's earliest layout and landscape design. His concept followed the precepts of Frederick Law Olmsted, but it was park commissioner Richard Sopris, who managed the park from 1881 to 1891, who is considered the father of the park. Construction of the park began in 1886 with “a sinuous tangle of winding carriageways, walks and promenades” put into place. The arrangement of roads and walks gave the park its pastoral feel, many of which are still in place today.

After the turn-of-the-century the park benefitted from the city's investment in the City Beautiful concept. The park was linked, as originally envisioned, to a wider system of parks using parkways and grand boulevards. During this period monumental sculpture was also introduced, consistent with City Beautiful philosophy, including the McLellan Gateway, the Sopris Gateway, the Monti Gateway, the Sullivan Gateway, and the Thatcher Memorial Fountain, which mark park entrances.

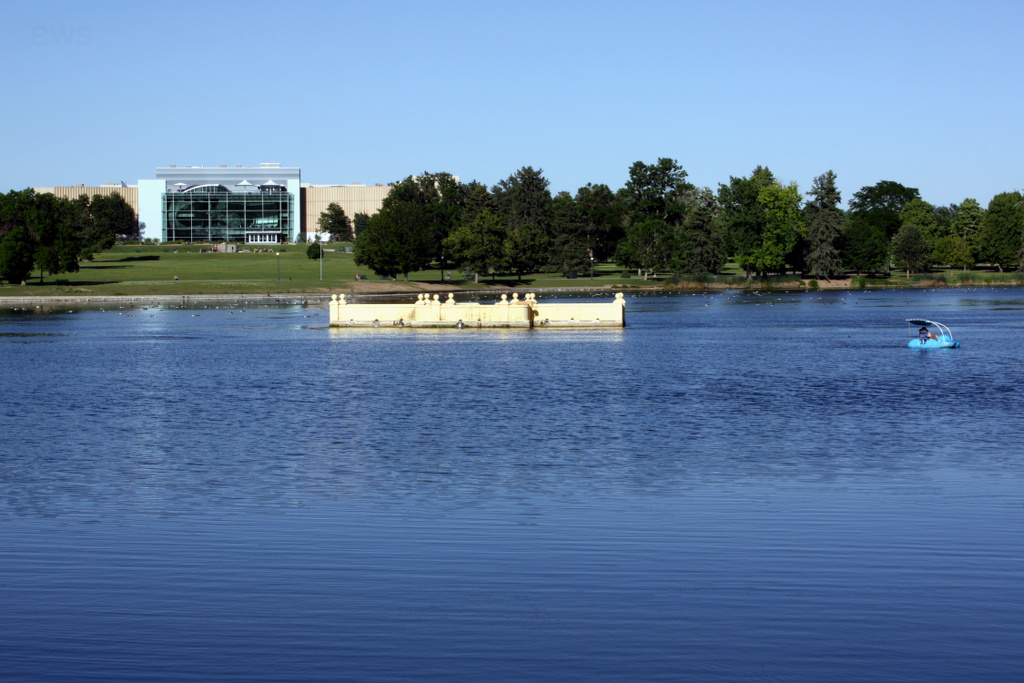
Ferril Lake and the Museum of Nature and Science

During the first half of the twentieth century a series of designers influenced and enhanced the park, including Reinhard Schuetze, S.R. DeBoer, George Kessler, Charles Robinson and the Olmsted brothers (the sons of Frederick Law Olmsted). S.R. DeBoer is recognized as the most influential, as his tenure as city landscape architect spanned almost fifty years, influencing that Park through 1960. Changes after 1960 included significant expansions by the Denver Zoo and the Denver Museum of Nature & Science (then the Natural History Museum). Both institutions have long histories in the park and contribute significantly to its character and use.

In the 1980s a concerted effort to document the history and design of the park led to a compilation of all city records on the park, and ultimately the National Register listing. The period of significance for the National Register listing is 1880 to 1936, but the multi-property form does not define a specific period of significance for City Park alone, and ends in 1936 because it was fifty years before the listing date, 1986.

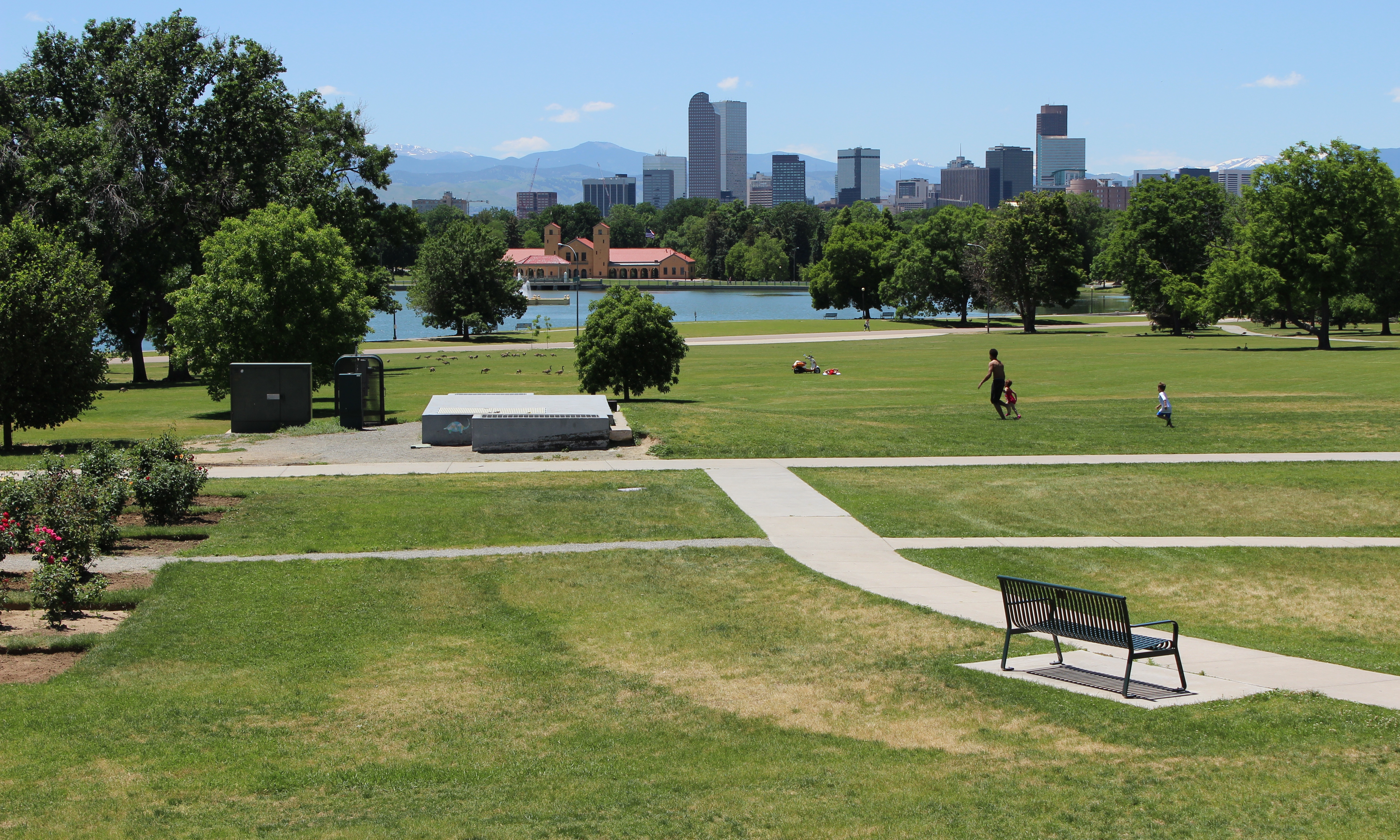
City Park overlooking Ferril Lake and downtown Denver

In the 1990s the park Pavilion was designated in a small local historic district, and the Graham-Bible House, once home to the park's caretaker, along with a historic firehouse located in the park, were also designated local landmarks.

In 1997 traffic and parking issues in the park led to a concerted planning effort to address land use, circulation and preservation. The City & County of Denver Parks & Recreation Department hosted numerous community meetings, and along with the efforts of a stakeholder group, created the 2001 City Park Master Plan, titled “Revitalizing the Legacy of City Park.” The Master Plan included a Historic Site Assessment, in which the park's contributing and non-contributing features were carefully researched and evaluated. Since 2001, the Department of Parks & Recreation has implemented many of the recommendations of this plan, including restoring sculptures and fountains, improving conditions at Ferril Lake and Duck Lake, and working with the park's institutions to create parking.

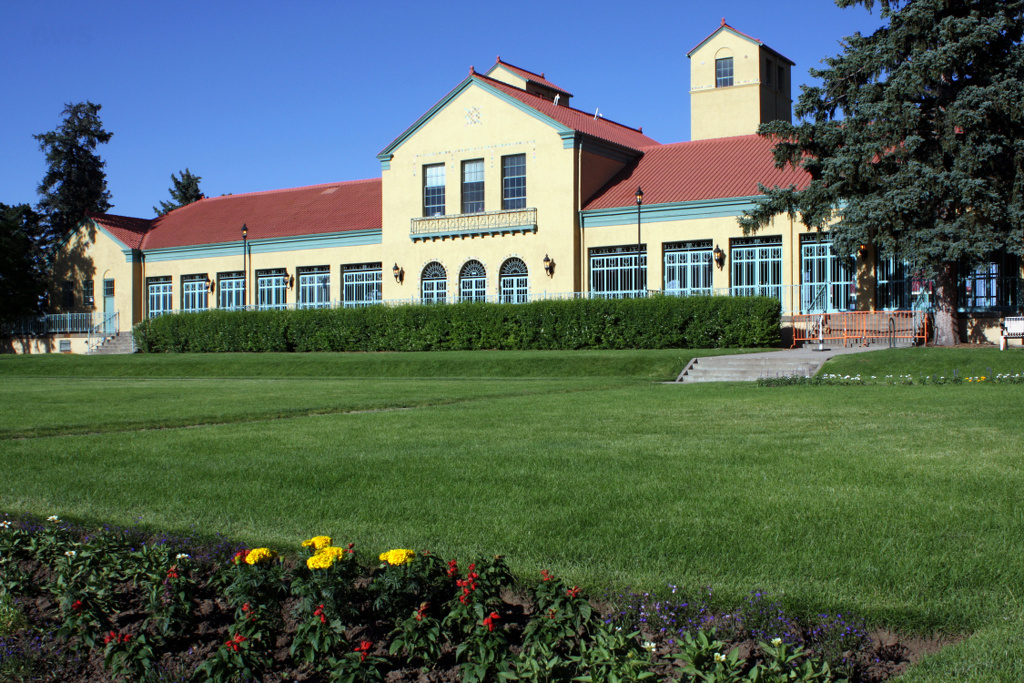
The boat pavilion's western facade

By the start of the 20th century, Ferril Lake, the Denver Zoo, and the landmark boat pavilion, with a Spanish-style design by architects John Humphreys and William Fisher were all developed in the park. Reinhard Schuetze, a German immigrant who was the head landscaper for Denver, formalized the design of the park by planting of formal gardens, laying down graceful carriage ways, and creating the East High School Esplanade into the park. In 1903, construction was completed for the first wing of the Denver Museum of Nature and Science, which was built on the eastern edge of the park on the highest elevation in the park (now famous for its views of downtown and the mountains behind them). It opened to the public on July 1, 1908.

On April 23, 1916, The Shakespeare Elm was planted near the intersection of 17th Avenue and Colorado Boulevard. A plaque at its base reads "Shakespeare Elm: The scion from which this tree was grown was taken from the tree at Shakespeare's grave at Stratford-on-Avon".

City Park sat a mile away from the rest of Denver when it was first opened. Competing trolley companies took park-goers along the undeveloped roads into the park. The neighborhood developed around the park, starting with farmers and squatters who used the city ditch to irrigate their crops. It wasn't until the start of the 20th century with better trolley connections that housing development occurred in force. The neighborhood includes East High School, a landmark built in 1925, which is Denver's first high school (moved from downtown). The neighborhood also contains many historic brick residential buildings, including many Denver square style homes and several historic brick commercial structures, especially along Colfax Avenue.

== Today ==
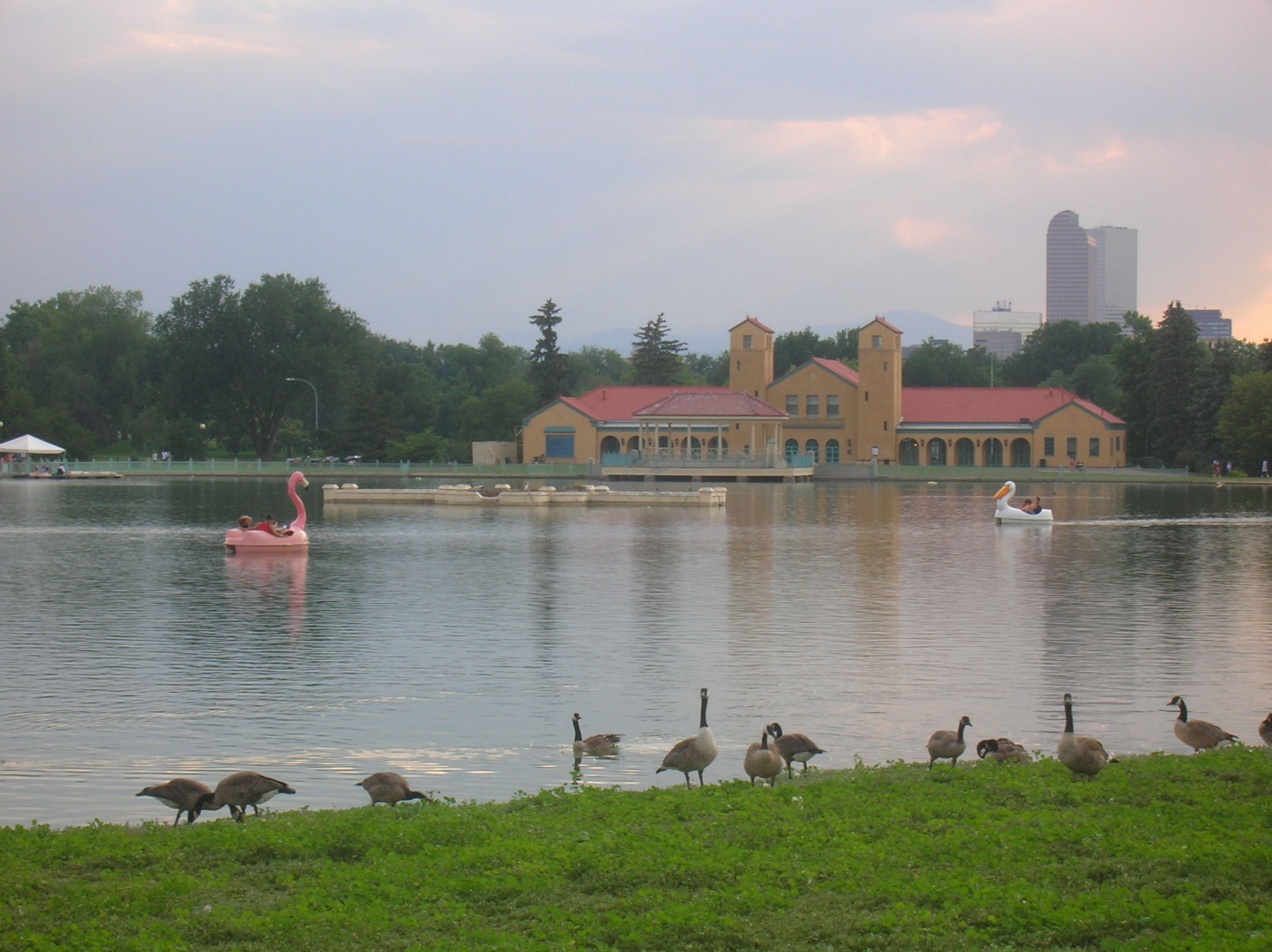
The boathouse with animal-shaped paddle boats on Ferril Lake

Colfax in the City Park neighborhood in particular, has become a popular area with many trendy restaurants, stores, and other businesses. The neighborhood has also seen new residential and commercial developments, including the twin towers of the Pinnacle at the former site of Mercy Hospital.

City Park itself is still the premier park in the city. Thousands of visitors continue to see not only the park itself but the cultural institutions contained within. The park holds a free summer concert series, and has boat rentals, both standard paddle-boats and some shaped like various water creatures like pelicans and ducks. The boathouse can also be rented for events.

Ferril Lake includes the Prismatic Fountain which dates back to 1908. Originally designed by engineer Frederic W. Darlington and was a revolutionary feature for the time. The recently renovated fountain now boasts LED lights which cycle through different formations, with each cycle spanning an hour.

== See also ==
- Bibliography of Colorado
- Elizabeth Allen Sopris Memorial
- Geography of Colorado
- History of Colorado
- Index of Colorado-related articles
- List of Colorado-related lists
  - List of neighborhoods in Denver
  - List of populated places in Colorado
- Outline of Colorado
