= Hale, Denver =

Hale
- Neighborhood
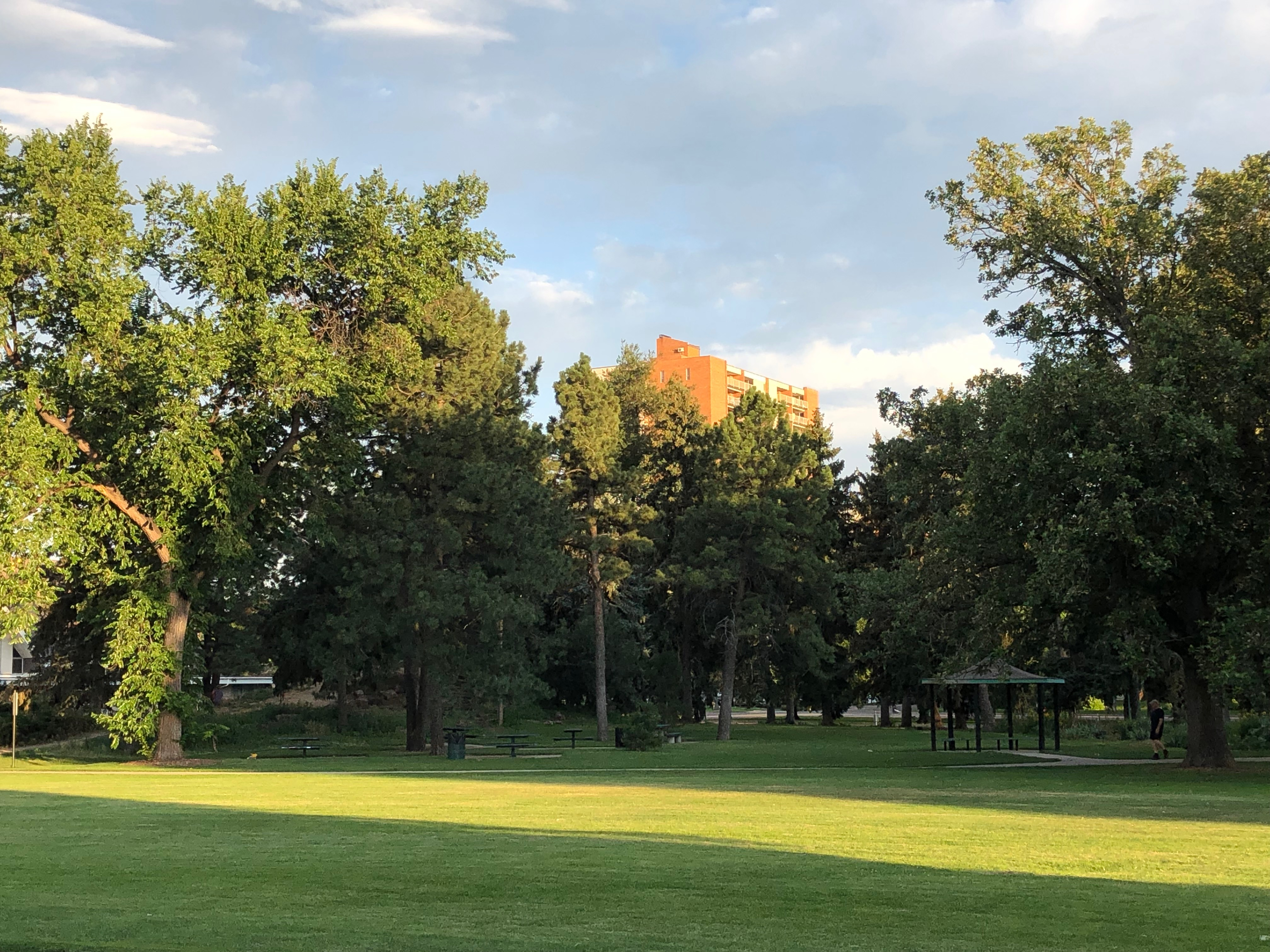
- Lindsley Park in the Hale neighborhood, golden hour
- Interactive map of Hale
- Coordinates: 39.7331°N 104.9301°W
- Country: United States
- State: Colorado
- City: Denver
- Named after: General Irving Hale

The Hale neighborhood is a designated statistical neighborhood in the City and County of Denver, Colorado. Its boundaries are Colfax Avenue to the north, 6th Avenue to the south, Colorado Boulevard to the west, and Holly Street to the east. Most of the neighborhood is represented by the Bellevue-Hale Neighborhood Association, a registered neighborhood organization.

== Name ==
The neighborhood, and the Hale Parkway which passes through the southern portion, was named for General Irving Hale, who served in the Spanish–American War and the Philippine–American War, and founded the Veterans of Foreign Wars.

== Notable businesses ==
The old locations of the University of Colorado Hospital and University of Colorado Denver medical school are located in the Hale Neighborhood along Colorado Boulevard. This site is currently being redeveloped with commercial and residential properties.

The Veterans Affairs Eastern Colorado Health Care System hospital was also located in the Hale neighborhood until its relocation to Anschutz Medical Campus in Aurora, Colorado, in August 2018. The future of the current VA hospital building and site is to be determined.

Rose Medical Center is located in the neighborhood, and National Jewish Health also owns property on the east side of Colorado Boulevard within the neighborhood.

== See also ==
- Bibliography of Colorado
- Geography of Colorado
- History of Colorado
- Index of Colorado-related articles
- List of Colorado-related lists
  - List of neighborhoods in Denver
  - List of populated places in Colorado
- Outline of Colorado
