= Park Hill, Denver =

Park Hill
- Neighborhood
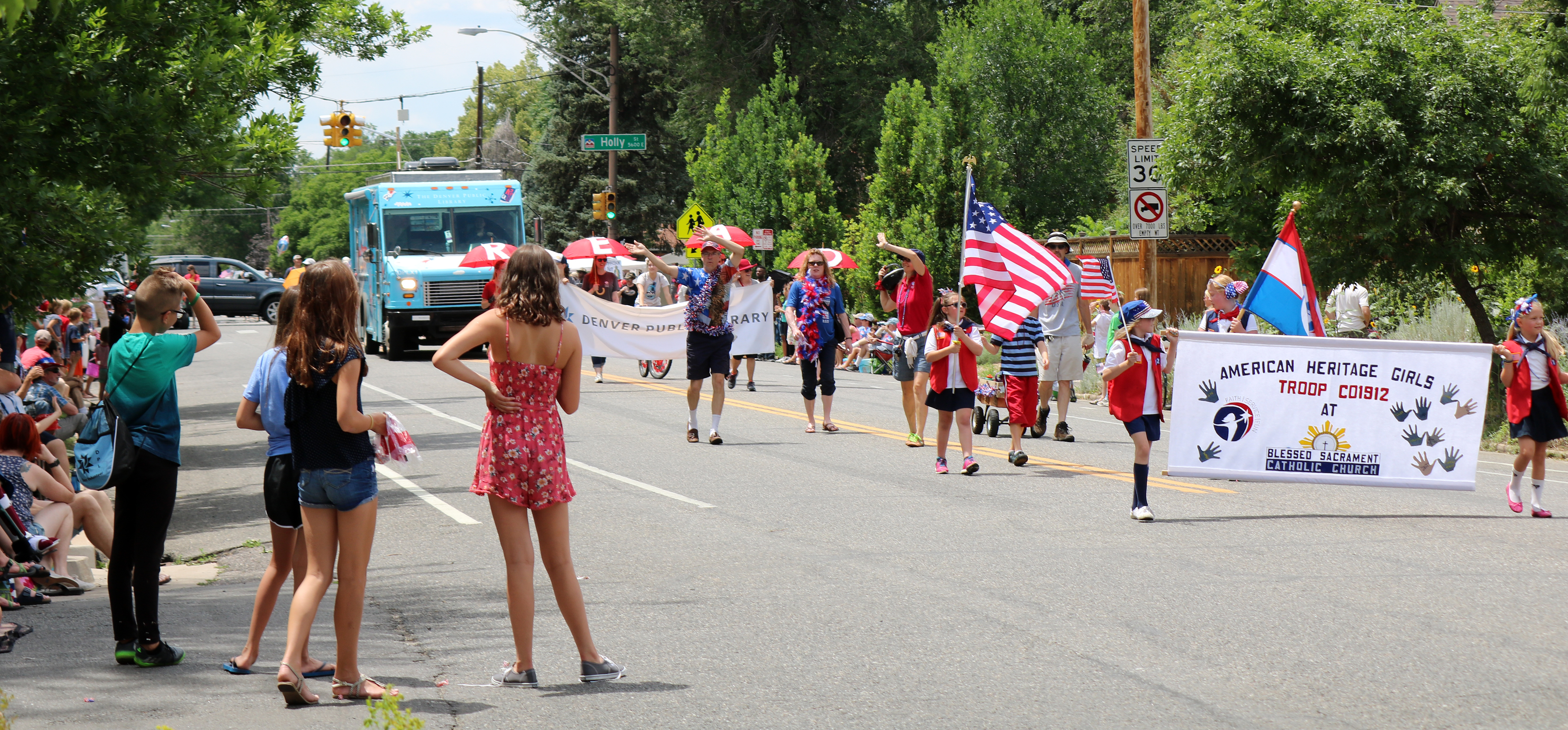
- Annual Fourth of July parade along 23rd Avenue.

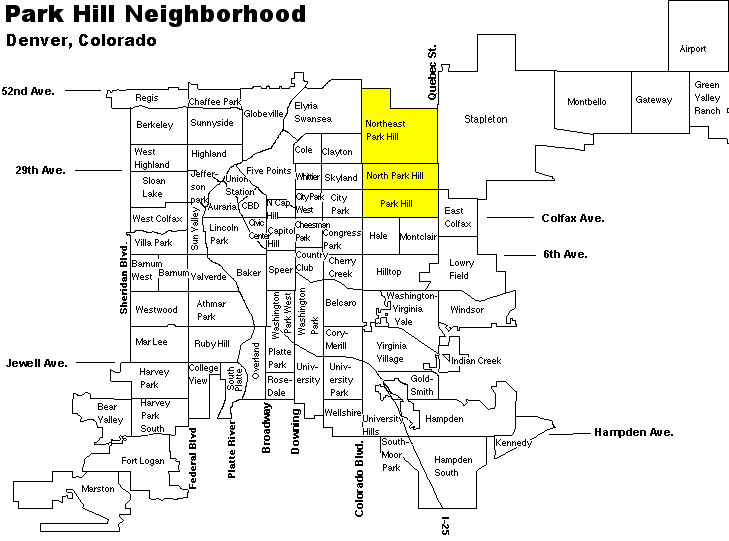

- Location in Colorado, USA
- Coordinates: 39.76195°N 104.92229°W
- Country: United States of America
- State: Colorado
- City: Denver

Population (2000)
  - Total: 26,422
- ZIP Codes: 80207, 80216, 80220

Park Hill is a neighborhood in Denver, Colorado, U.S. Located in the northeastern quadrant of the city, it is bordered by Colorado Boulevard on the west, East Colfax Avenue on the south, Quebec Street on the east, and East 52nd Avenue on the north. The entire Park Hill neighborhood is located in the area known as East Denver. It is further divided by the City and County of Denver into three administrative neighborhoods, South Park Hill, North Park Hill, and Northeast Park Hill.

== History ==
Park Hill's modern boundaries include the historic Denver developments of Park Hill, Hartman's Addition, Colfax Heights, Downington, Strayer's Park Place, Bellemont, Park Hill Annex, Oakland, Wareington, San Rafael, Linwood, Colfax Addition, and East Swansea.

=== Early Development ===
==== Hartman's Addition ====
Casper R. Hartman was the first speculator to purchase land in what is now Park Hill. After building a freighting business between Denver and St. Joseph Missouri, Hartman built a livery stable in West Denver, and in 1871 purchased the roughly 140 acre area bounded by Colorado/McKinley Ave. to the west, Montview Blvd. to the north, Dahlia/Caribou St. to the east, and Colfax Ave. to the south. This area forms the modern southwest corner of Park Hill. Hartman platted the land in squares as opposed to rectangles, which created a group of streets with slight variation from other sections of the neighborhood. The streets of Ash, Birch, and Dexter, do not cut through Hartman's Addition, and Batavia Pl. was added as an accommodation between 16th and 17th.

==== Baron von Winckler ====
The name "Park Hill" originated with the land platted by Baron Alois Gillaume Eugene von Winkler in 1887. Von Winkler purchased a thirty-two block site directly north of Hartman's Addition, just east of City Park, for $20,000. Inspired by fellow German Denver developer Baron Walter von Richthofen, von Winkler sought to create a picturesque suburban haven. Perhaps contrary to this goal, the baron constructed a racetrack in Park Hill, which was eventually overshadowed by a larger one at City Park. Von Winkler also utilized the early Park Hill land to raise horses and dogs and to host the city dog pound. In June 1898, Baron von Winkler committed suicide using strychnine and a gun.

Von Winckler's land was purchased by an eastern investment group, the "Park Hill Syndicate," for $60,500. Led by David B. Gamble, Earl Cranston, Gene Hamilton, and Robert T. Miller, the syndicate sold lots for $150 to $300 and defined strict rules for developing the neighborhood, requiring houses to be set back forty feet from the street to allow for spacious tree lawns and sidewalks and requiring houses to be built costing no less than $3,000 at a time when houses in Denver were usually built for $1,000. In 1903, Denver annexed the previously unincorporated suburb of Park Hill.

=== Civil Rights and Diversity ===
By the 1920s, Park Hill's development had shaped it into a highly sought-after neighborhood, marked by racial restrictions established by developers to maintain exclusivity. In the post-WWII era, housing shortages in the nearby black neighborhood of Five Points led black middle-class homebuyers to seek a less crowded neighborhood in North Park Hill. This led to blockbusting practices by realtors to increase housing sales, and the integration resulted in white flight. In an effort to actively manage the changes in the neighborhood, a group of churches and community members came together to form the Park Hill Action Committee was formed in 1960.

Many black families faced hurdles in securing mortgages and acceptance from neighbors. Conflicts over residential integration soon extended to the matter of Denver's segregated public schools. Park Hill resident Rachel Noel championed school integration in the mid-1960s, resulting in a court-ordered integration that significantly impacted Denver's public schools.

In recent decades, the Park Hill community has been active on various quality-of-life issues, such as toxic waste, airport flight paths, and crime. Residents take pride in the neighborhood's tradition of diversity. The greater neighborhood is uniquely integrated, with strong individual communities in particular areas: North and Northeast Park Hill have a significant black and Hispanic community, while South Park Hill is predominantly white. In recent years, a significant number of black residents have left Northeast Park Hill as housing in the area has become more expensive.

== Notable Establishments ==
=== Schools ===
Park Hill's first school was the two-room "Park School," built in 1894 at the northwest corner of 18th and Forest. In 1901, a more substantial structure was built and renamed Park Hill School in 1904. Over time, the school underwent various expansions, including a three-story addition in 1912 and a gymnasium and auditorium in 1928. In 1948, it was the most crowded elementary school in the Denver Public School system. In 1994 it was granted Denver Landmark designation for its longevity, social history, and outstanding architectural elements. Park Hill School is built in the Spanish Colonial Revival style.

Park Hill built its first middle school as the Holly Junior High School, and later renamed it Park Hill Junior High School, Smiley Middle School. It is now called Smiley Campus and features the McAuliffe International School. Sitting on the former Ezra M. Bell estate, it was the first desegregated junior high school in Denver as per the Keyes v. DPS case in 1969. Smiley Campus is a Tudor Revival school with various shades of red brick, contrasting buff-colored cement, and light terra-cotta ornamentation.

=== Park Hill Library ===
The Denver Public Library branch on Montview Boulevard is a Carnegie Foundation-funded building that mirrors the ornate residential designs of the street. Designed by Denver architect brothers Merrill and Burnham Hoyt, the library features a Mediterranean-inspired exterior with cast stone cornice, trim, and decorations, red Spanish roof tiles, coffered eaves, and wrought-iron entry lamps. The interior space consists of a single large room with leaded, diamond pane windows, wrought-iron and glass globe reading lamps, built-in bookcases and window-bay seating, textured walls, a beamed ceiling, and a cast stone fireplace adorned with a bas-relief ship from Coleridge's poem, The Rime of the Ancient Mariner, by Denver sculptor Robert Garrison.

=== Denver Children's Home ===
In 1876, Margaret Evans, Elizabeth Byers, Elizabeth Iliff Warren, and other prominent Denver women established the Denver Orphans Home to help the thousands of poorly housed or homeless children in Colorado. Relocating to its current location at 1501 Albion Street in 1902, the facility has grown into a fifty-room complex that includes a playground. The Denver Children's Home (renamed in 1962) now focuses on treating emotionally distressed children and adolescents, offering various services such as outpatient care, after-school programs, and intensive in-home programs. The home added a Highlands Ranch facility in 2000.

=== Park Hill Golf Course Open Space ===
The Park Hill Golf Course Open Space is bordered by Colorado Blvd, 35th Ave, Dahlia St, and 40th Ave. In January 2025, the mayor of Denver announced that the city would acquire the property in a land swap. As of January 2025, the city intends to open a park in summer 2025 with an immediate short-term use as open space. Interim use and long-term use of the park will be determined with public input.

The land was originally owned by George W. Clayton a Denver businessman and philanthropist, and he operated it as a dairy farm. Clayton left his entire estate in a trust which stipulated the creation of a school for boys. The Clayton School for Boys opened in 1911 across Colorado Boulevard from the property. Up until 1930, the dairy farm continued to operate and was used to teach agricultural skills to the boys attending the school.

In 1930, the Clayton trust signed an operating license for a golf course. The course was established by Robert Shearer, who operated it until 1970. In 1986, the Clayton Foundation, which managed the trust that owned the course, put the property on the market but was unable to sell the land, likely due to the oil and gas bust of the 1980s. Instead, in 1997, Mayor Wellington Webb made a deal with the foundation to place a conservation easement on the land to limit its use to a golf course and open space. The golf course faced tax issues and changed operators several times, eventually shutting down operations in 2018.

In 2019, Westside Investment Partners purchased the land for $24 million, taking over a lawsuit filed by previous leaseholder Arcis Golf against the city of Denver. Westside's development plans sparked opposition from groups like Save Open Space Denver, who argued that the conservation easement should prevent further development. Following a series of community conversations, legal battles, and city council decisions, voters rejected Westside's proposal to redevelop the site into housing, retail, and park space in April 2023 in the hopes of creating Denver's fourth-largest park.

=== Greater Park Hill Community Organization ===
The Greater Park Hill Community (GPHC) is a non-profit neighborhood organization formed in 1961. The GPHC, managed and staffed largely by volunteers: serves as a liaison between local residents and businesses and the City and County of Denver; publishes a monthly newspaper, the Greater Park Hill News, which is distributed free to residents of Park Hill's administrative neighborhoods and nearby businesses; operates a Youth Jobs Program to help young people ages 12–15 find summer jobs; and sponsors an annual home tour in the fall, The Greater Park Hill Home Tour, which has been held for the past 30 years.

=== The Holly ===
In 2008, nine individuals were indicted for burning down Holly Shopping Center in retaliation for the murder of Michael Asberry. The area around the shopping center, also known as Holly Square, was a known hangout for Bloods gang members. The arson, which caused over $2 million in damages, was captured on a nearby library's camera. The suspects were charged with use of explosives or incendiary devices, criminal mischief, first-degree arson, conspiracy, and possession of explosives.

In 2021, journalist Julian Rubinstein released a book titled, "The Holly: Five Bullets, One Gun, and the Struggle to Save an American Neighborhood." Rubinstein discusses the 2013 shooting of Hasan Jones by Terrance Roberts, a former gang member turned peace activist and explores the social and historical context that brought the two men together, detailing Roberts's transformation into a prominent figure in the peace movement. The book also focuses on questionable practices within anti-gang efforts and law enforcement's relationship with the Holly community. The book follows Roberts' trial for attempted murder, assault, and possessing a weapon, while highlighting the psychological toll of his experiences. Rubinstein's work emphasizes the complexity of addressing violence, as it is influenced by state surveillance, structural racism, and socioeconomic struggles.

=== Dahlia Square ===
In the early 1950s, the Dahlia Square Shopping Center was built in Northeast Park Hill atop a landfill. Located between Dahlia Street and Elm Street and between East 33rd Avenue and East 35th Avenue, it was the commercial heart of the neighborhood during its time, and at its peak featured a number of businesses including a grocery store. As time passed, it fell into disrepair and was considered a nuisance by residents.

Starting in the 1990s, under efforts by then-mayor Wellington Webb, several redevelopment plans were considered, but none was successful until April 2005, after Webb left office. In that month, the site was purchased by Parkhill Community Inc., a subsidiary of Brownfield Partners, LLC, which had been chosen by the Denver Urban Renewal Authority (DURA) to clean up the site and prepare it for redevelopment. In late 2005, DURA announced it would work exclusively with Alliance Development Partners, Inc., to redevelop the site when remediation was complete. Alliance was formed by Webb and partners.

Demolition of the structures on the site, including removal of asbestos, was completed by December 2005, and remediation of the landfill began in February 2006.

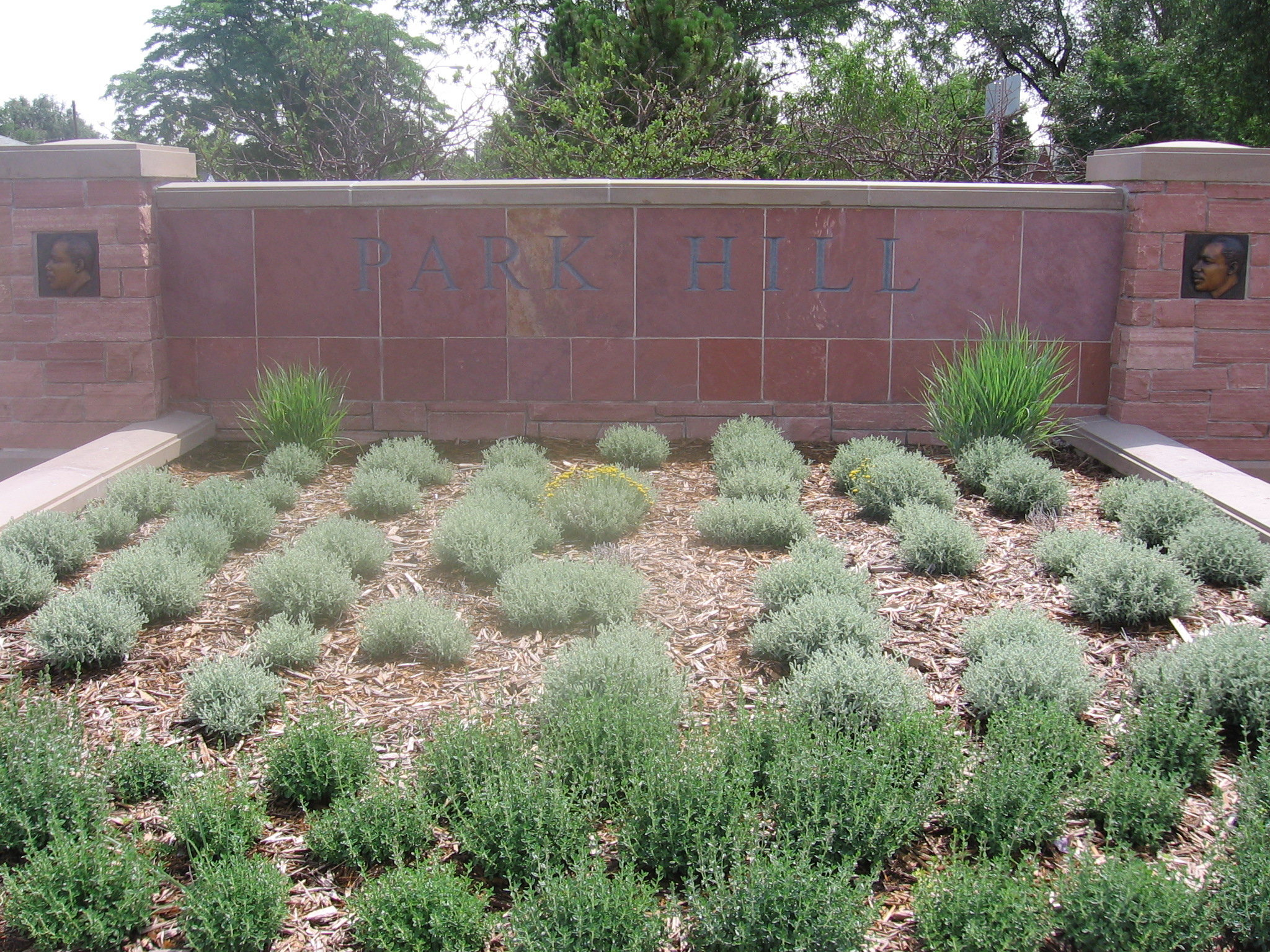
Sign at the west entrance to Park Hill on Martin Luther King Boulevard, immediately east of Colorado Boulevard

== Demographics ==
Data from the U.S. census indicate that in the year 2000, there were a total of 26,422 residents in 10,221 households in the three administrative neighborhoods comprising Park Hill. Income increased from north to south, and the number of minority residents increased from south to north. The racial makeup of Park Hill, as a whole, is 39.76 percent white (27.06 percent white alone-non Hispanic), 51.48 percent African American, 2.87 percent Asian, 1.21 percent Native American. Hispanic or Latino of any race is 17.38 percent of the population.

=== South Park Hill ===
Based on the American Community Survey, from 2013 to 2017, South Park Hill had 9,491 residents. The racial makeup of the neighborhood was 84% white, 9% African American, 3% Asian. Hispanic or Latino of any race was 9% percent of the population. Its median income was $51,703.

=== North Park Hill ===
Based on the American Community Survey, from 2013 to 2017, North Park Hill had 10,351 residents. The racial makeup of the neighborhood was 61% white, 27% African American, 1% Asian. Hispanic or Latino of any race was 12% percent of the population. Its median income was $44,211.

In 2000, North Park Hill had 10,057 residents in 3,944 households. North Park Hill's racial breakdown was 29.82 percent white (18.45 percent white alone-non Hispanic), 59.01 percent African American, 2.14 percent Asian, 0.96 percent Native American. Hispanic or Latino of any race was 19.44 percent of the population. Its median income was $58,392.34, slightly higher than the city's overall median income of $55,128.62.

=== Northeast Park Hill ===
Based on the American Community Survey, from 2013 to 2017, Northeast Park Hill had 9,669 residents. The racial makeup of the neighborhood was 45% white, 42% African American, 1% Asian. Hispanic or Latino of any race was 26% percent of the population. Its median income was $23,806.

In 2010, the area had 7,821 residents in 2,722 households, with a racial makeup of 13.53% white, 50.74% African American, 0.96% Asian, 0.72% Native American. Hispanic or Latino of any race was 30.03 percent of the population. Its median income was $37,468.06, below the city's overall median income of $55,128.62.

The average price per square foot for a home in Park Hill in April 2023 was $413/sf, up from $272/sf in November 2017.

== Notable residents ==
- Detroit Pistons basketball player and 2004 NBA Finals MVP Award winner Chauncey Billups
- Former USC and NFL running back LenDale White
- Former University of Arizona and former Denver Broncos running back Mike Bell was raised in Park Hill.
- Jazz singer Dianne Reeves is a current resident
- Denver mayor, Colorado governor, and Colorado senator John Hickenlooper moved to Park Hill in 2007
- ESPN The Magazine and former Sports Illustrated columnist Rick Reilly was born in Park Hill
- Actress and Golden Globe winner Pam Grier lived in Park Hill and attended East High School
- Victoria "Vikki" Buckley Secretary of State of Colorado, raised in Park Hill and attended East High School

== See also ==
- Bibliography of Colorado
- Geography of Colorado
- History of Colorado
- Index of Colorado-related articles
- List of Colorado-related lists
  - List of neighborhoods in Denver
  - List of populated places in Colorado
- Outline of Colorado
