= City Park West, Denver =

Neighborhood of Denver, Colorado, United States

Coordinates: 39.7448°N 104.9648°W

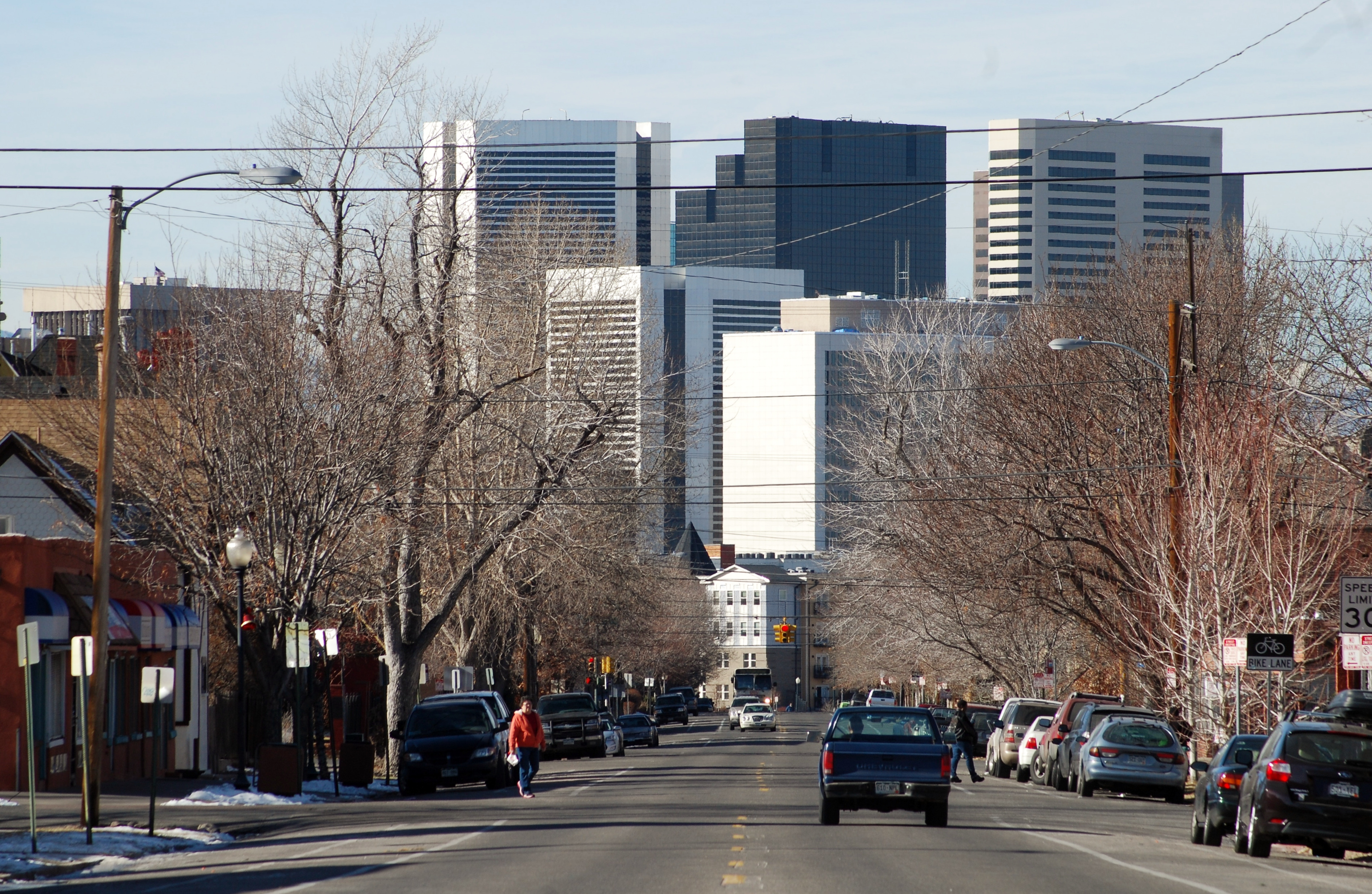
Looking west down 22nd Street, City Park West, Denver CO

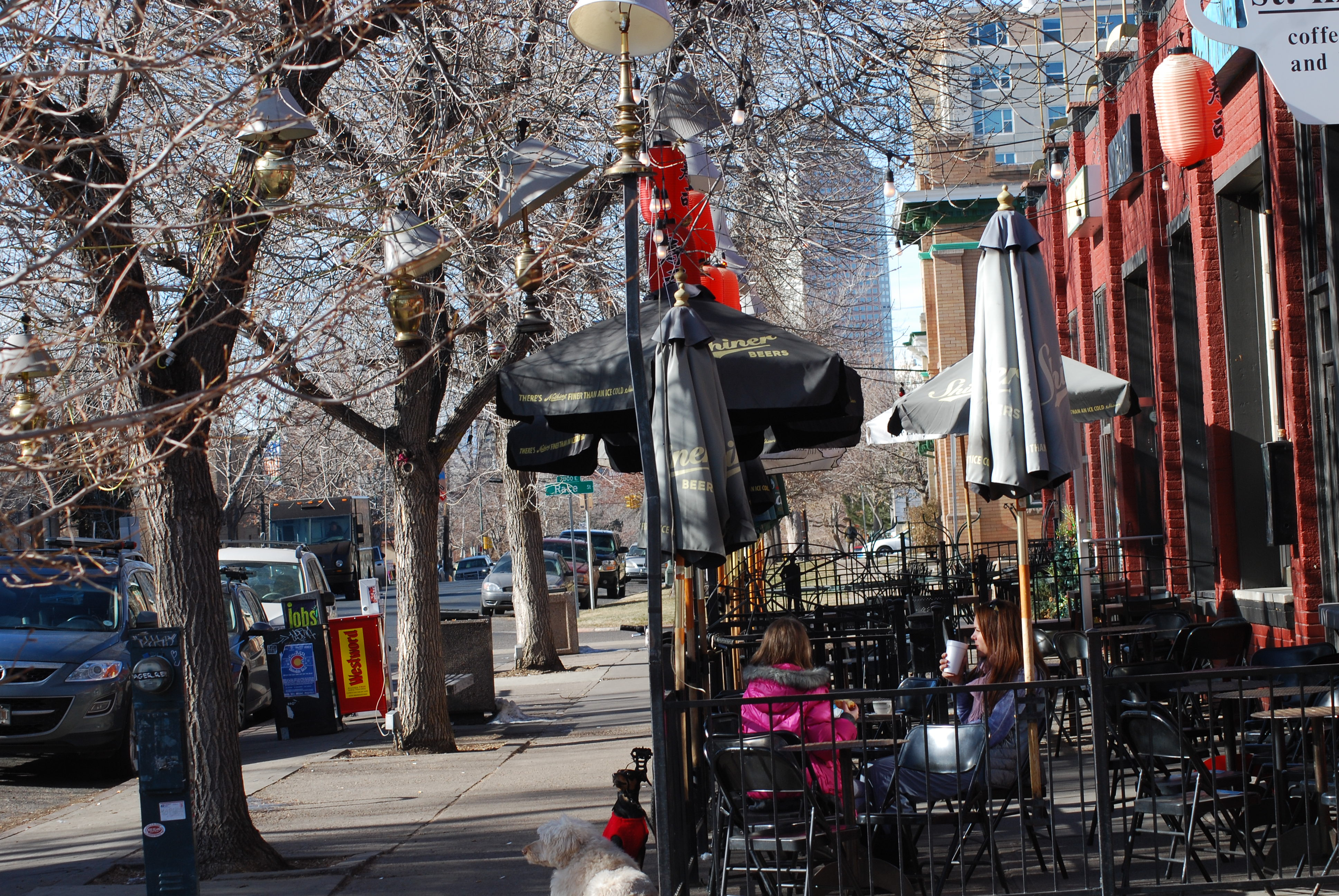
Shops on 17th and Race St, City Park West, Denver, CO

City Park West is a neighborhood of Denver, Colorado. It is a district of mostly single-family homes, small apartment buildings, and one very large hospital complex. The center of the district features the medical facilities of Presbyterian/St. Luke's Hospital, Exempla St. Joseph's Hospital, and a number of other medical office buildings and related facilities. Exempla Saint Joseph's Hospital opened an 83,000 square foot facility in December 2014.

== Boundaries ==
The neighborhood is bordered on the west by Downing Street, on the north by 23rd Avenue, on the east by York Street, and on the south by Colfax Avenue.

== Notable sites ==
- City Park
- Exempla Saint Joseph Hospital
- Presbyterian/St. Luke's Medical Center

== Gallery ==
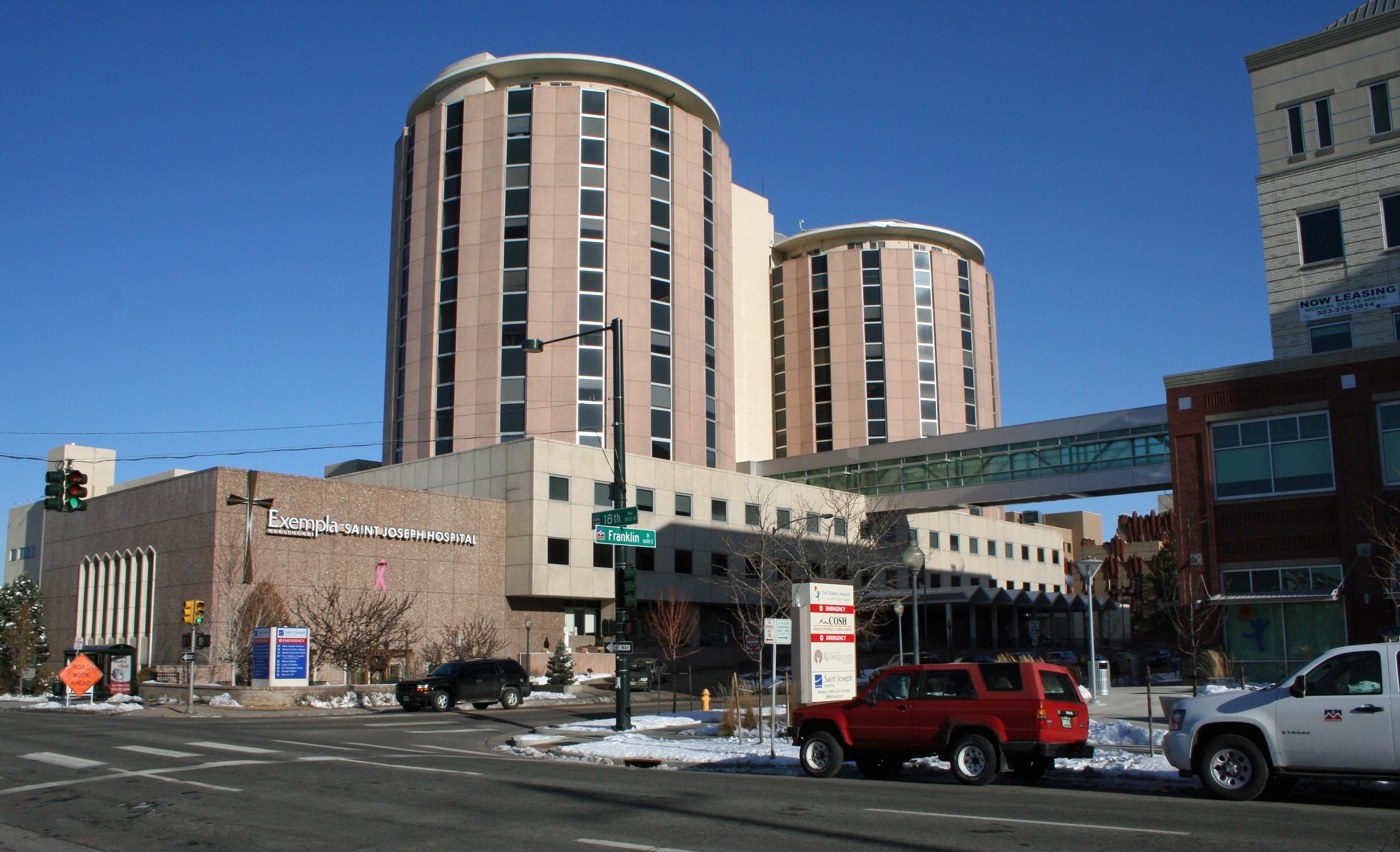
Exempla Saint Joseph Hospital.

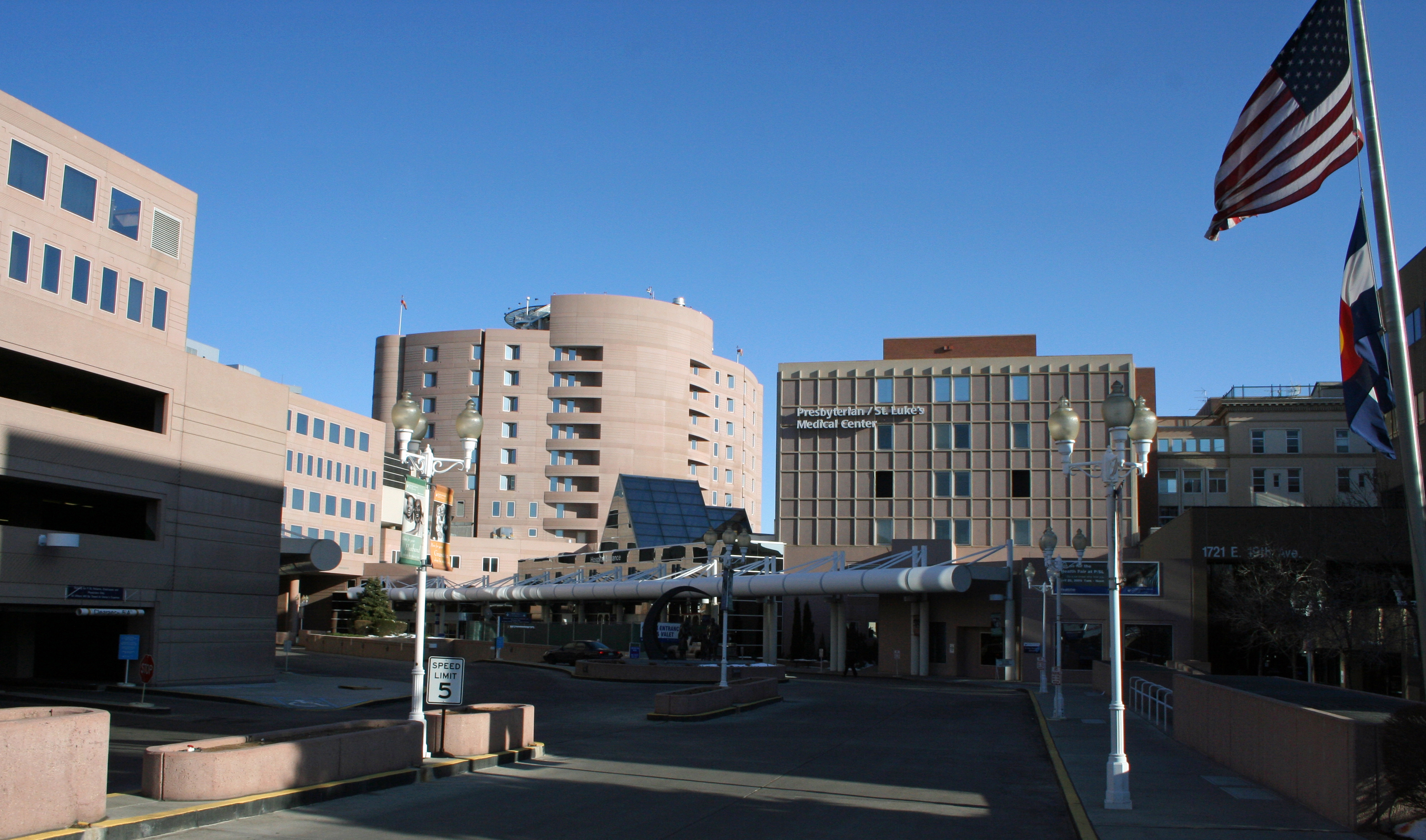
Presbyterian/St. Luke's Medical Center.

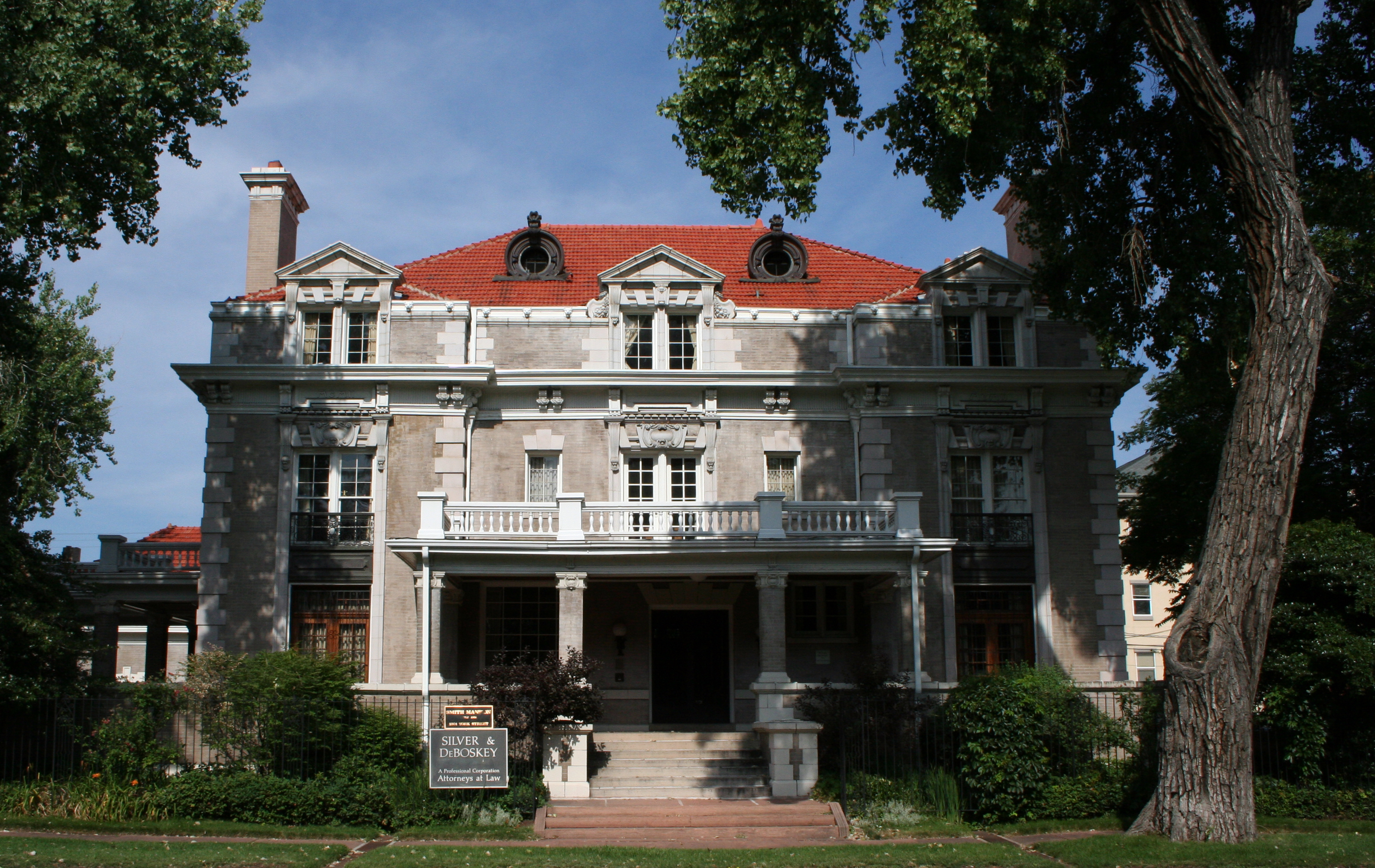
Smith House, listed on the National Register of Historic Places, is at 1801 York Street.

== See also ==
- Bibliography of Colorado
- Geography of Colorado
- History of Colorado
- Index of Colorado-related articles
- List of Colorado-related lists
  - List of neighborhoods in Denver
  - List of populated places in Colorado
- Outline of Colorado
