= Annunciation Roman Catholic Church (Denver) =

Historic Catholic parish in Colorado, United States

- Annunciation Church
- U.S. National Register of Historic Places
- Colorado State Register of Historic Properties
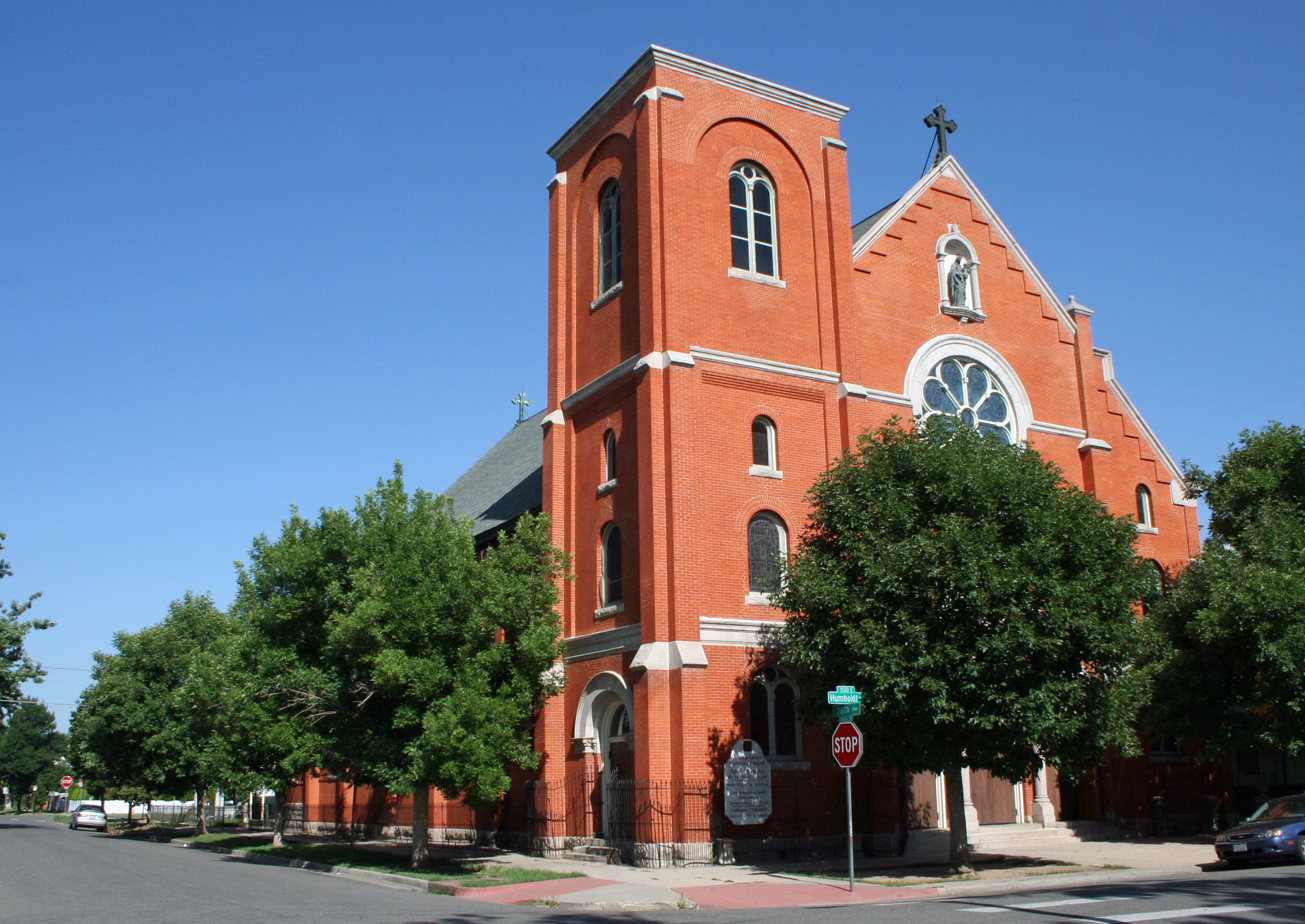

- Location within Colorado Location within the United States
- Interactive map showing the location of Annunciation Roman Catholic Church
- Location: 3601 Humboldt Street; Denver, Colorado
- Coordinates: 39°46′2″N 104°58′11″W
- Area: less than one acre
- Built: 1904-07
- Built by: Kenney, Michael J.
- Architect: Paroth, Frederick W.
- Architectural style: Gothic Revival, Romanesque
- NRHP reference No.: 90000869
- CSRHP No.: 5DV.3287
- Added to NRHP: June 21, 1990

The Annunciation Church in Denver, Colorado is an historic Catholic parish church at 3601 Humboldt Street. It is part of the Archdiocese of Denver.

The structure was built during 1904 to 1907 and was added to the National Register in 1990, one of several registered in northeast Denver.

It is built with red brick walls with white cut stone trim. It has elements of Romanesque Revival and Gothic Revival architecture. A planned steeple and bell tower were never built, so its highest point is its cross on the roof's peak. It included stained glass from Mayer and Co. in Munich, Germany. Its main altar is Carrara marble from Italy.

== In popular culture ==
In 1988, Annunciation Church was featured in the first season of Father Dowling Mysteries, standing in for the main character's church, "St. Michael's."
