= Congress Park, Denver =

Park and neighborhood in Denver, Colorado, United States

Coordinates: 39.7321°N 104.9495°W

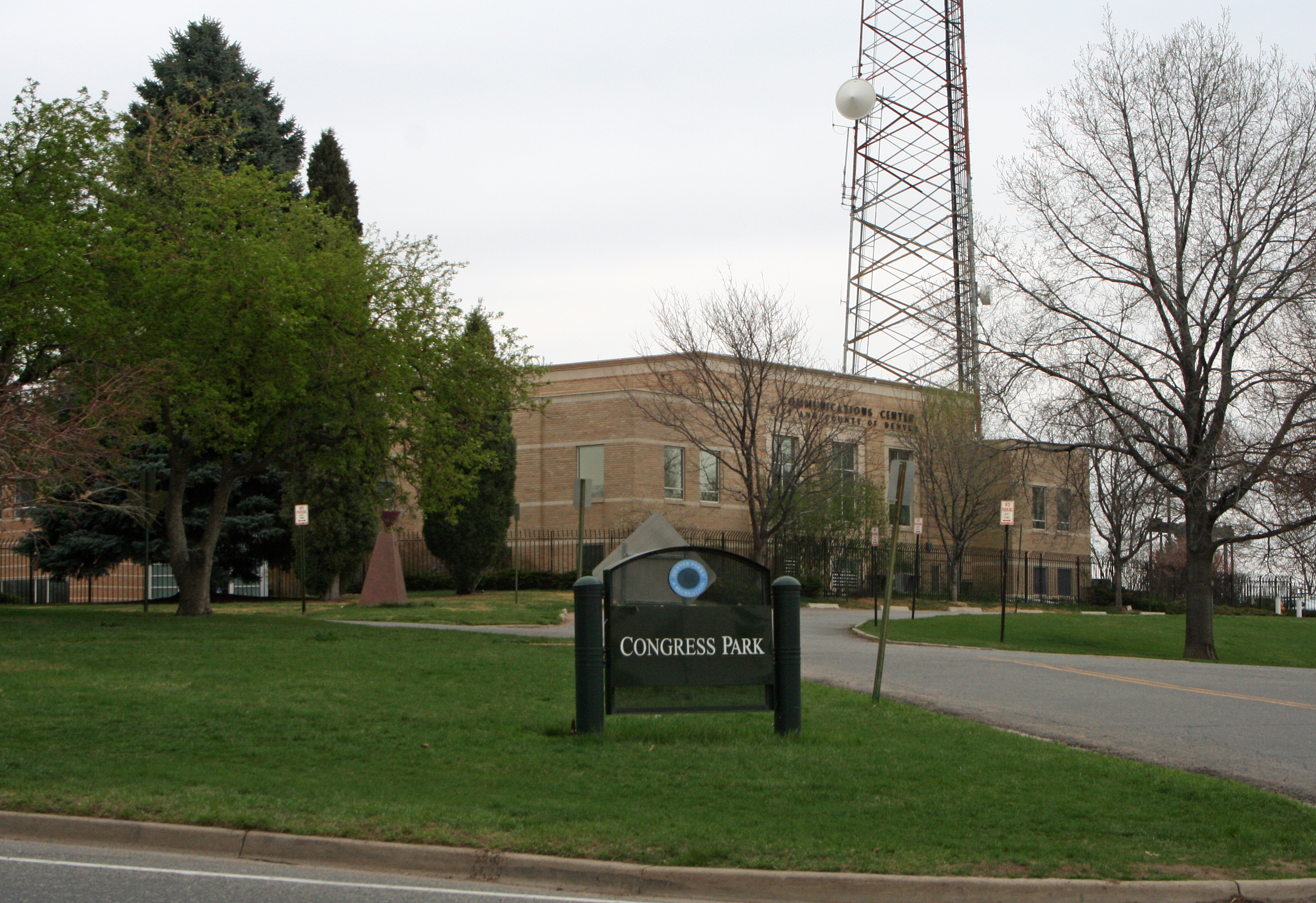
Part of Congress Park in Denver, with the Denver Police and Fire Communications Center in the background.

Congress Park is a park and a neighborhood in the City and County of Denver, Colorado, United States. In 2010, the neighborhood had 10,235 residents and 5,724 households.

== Demographics ==
Congress Park has a median income of $62,925. (2000) compared to $55,129 for Denver as a whole. The neighborhood's poverty rate is 10.7% compared to 14.3% for Denver as a whole. Racial make-up is 82.4% white, 4.5% African-American, 8.1% Latino, and 2.1% Asian-Pacific; 9.7% of Congress Park residents are foreign born.

== History ==
Between 1880 and 1890, Denver's population grew from 35,000 to over 100,000. By the late 1880s, the air quality in Denver had pushed the population to the outskirts of town and improvements in transportation such as cable cars made the eastern sections of the Capitol Hill neighborhood more accessible to the middle class. With the growing population and expanding middle class, Congress Park was platted into more than ten subdivisions between 1887 and 1888 and on March 11, 1889 the area was incorporated into Denver. While originally known as Capitol Heights, Congress Park neighborhood has been used by the city of Denver since the 1970s.

The area was originally known as Cemetery Hill; named after the City Cemetery located in the area. In 1887, the city of Denver constructed a reservoir on land previously designated as part of the cemetery but never used as such, and by 1890 the cemetery had become a deterrent to growth in the eastern Capitol Hill neighborhood; so much so that Colorado Senator Henry Teller put forth a bill requesting the land be redesigned to a park. The graves were relocated and Congress Park was born. The original park encompassed lands that currently include Cheesman Park, the Denver Botanic Gardens, and the Denver Water Board. In 1903, the area south of the reservoir to 8th Ave. became the city nursery supplying the growing city with the trees and flowers for its parks and parkways.

The area to the north and east of the nursery expanded dramatically after 1908 when a second reservoir was built in the area.

Since 2016, the congress park flag football league(CPFFL) has been meeting every Sunday during the football season.

== Boundaries ==
According to the 1995 Congress Park Neighborhood Plan, "The Congress Park neighborhood is bounded on the west by York Street, on the north by Colfax Avenue, on the east by Colorado Boulevard and on the south by Sixth Avenue."

== Landmarks ==
The park contains eight tennis courts, several athletic fields, a children's playground, a picnic pavilion, and one of Denver's public outdoor swimming pools.

The Denver Botanic Gardens is located on the west side of York St in Cheesman Park. The Communications Center of the City and County of Denver is located at 950 Josephine Street, in the north end of Congress Park, and is easily seen because of its tall antenna. The building houses Denver's 911 call center and its police and fire dispatchers. Adjacent to the Congress Park's north border are several underground water storage cisterns, owned and operated by the Denver Water Department.

The Congress Park neighborhood includes a large section of East Seventh Avenue Parkway, along which runs Denver's largest historic district, the 7th Avenue Historic District.

== See also ==
- Bibliography of Colorado
- Geography of Colorado
- History of Colorado
- Index of Colorado-related articles
- List of Colorado-related lists
  - List of neighborhoods in Denver
  - List of populated places in Colorado
- Outline of Colorado
