= St. Ignatius Loyola Church (Denver) =

Historic church in Colorado, United States

- U.S. National Register of Historic Places
- Colorado State Register of Historic Properties
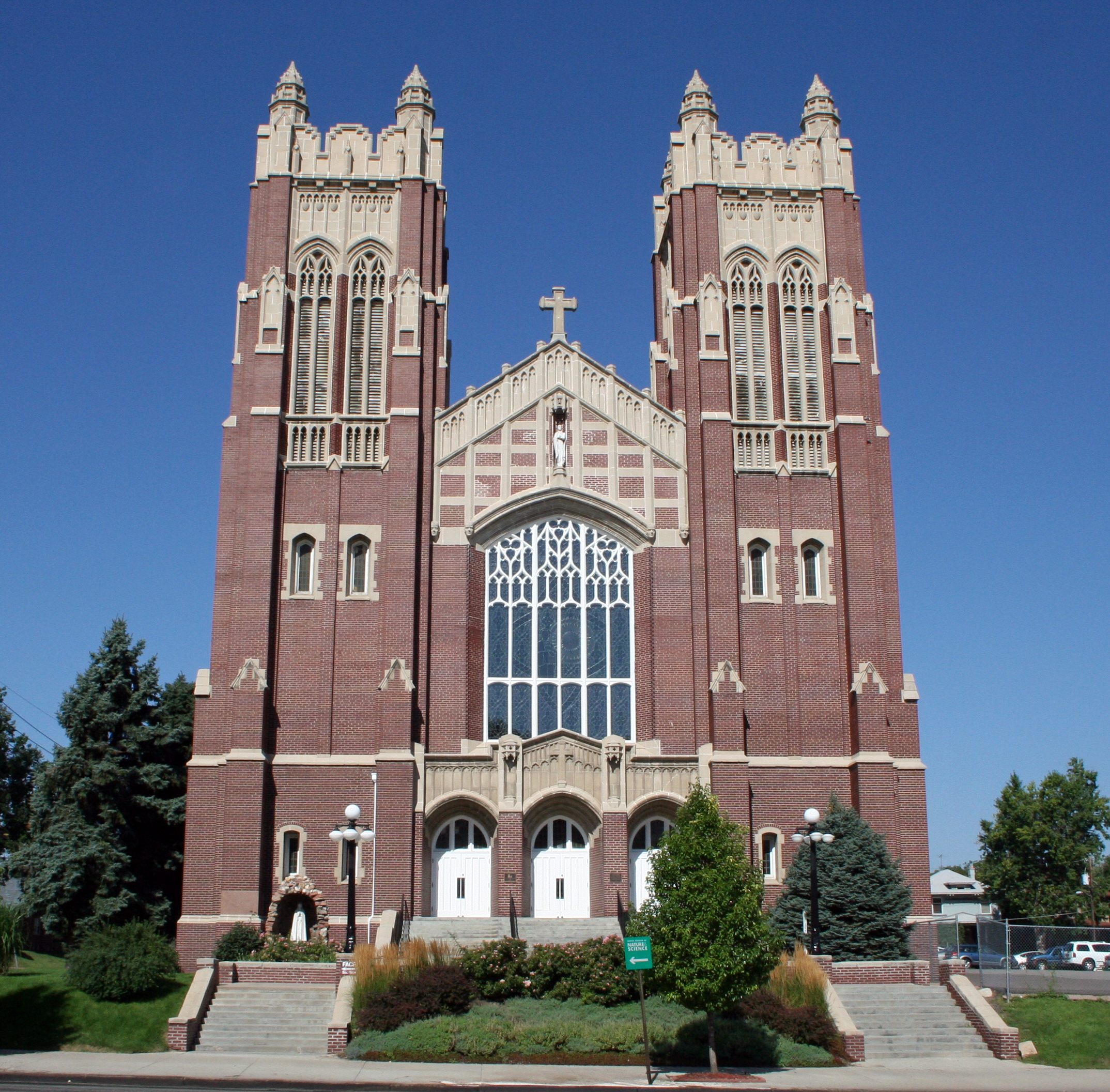

- Location within Colorado Location within the United States
- Location: Jct. of E. 23rd Ave. and York St., Denver, Colorado
- Coordinates: 39°45′5″N 104°57′35″W
- Area: 2.3 acres (0.93 ha)
- Built: 1924
- Architect: Frewen, Frank W., Jr.; Mountjoy, Frank E.
- Architectural style: Late Gothic Revival
- NRHP reference No.: 94001468
- CSRHP No.: 5DV.7028
- Added to NRHP: December 23, 1994

The St. Ignatius Loyola Church in Denver, Colorado is a historic church at the junction of E. 23rd Ave. and York Street. It was built in 1924 and was added to the National Register of Historic Places in 1994.

It has a truncated cruciform plan. It is 192 feet (59 m) long, 75 feet (23 m) feet wide, and 109 feet (33 m) tall.

It was designed by the architectural firm of Mountjoy and Frewen.
