= Cole, Denver =

Neighborhood of Denver, Colorado, US

Coordinates: 39.7670°N 104.9660°W

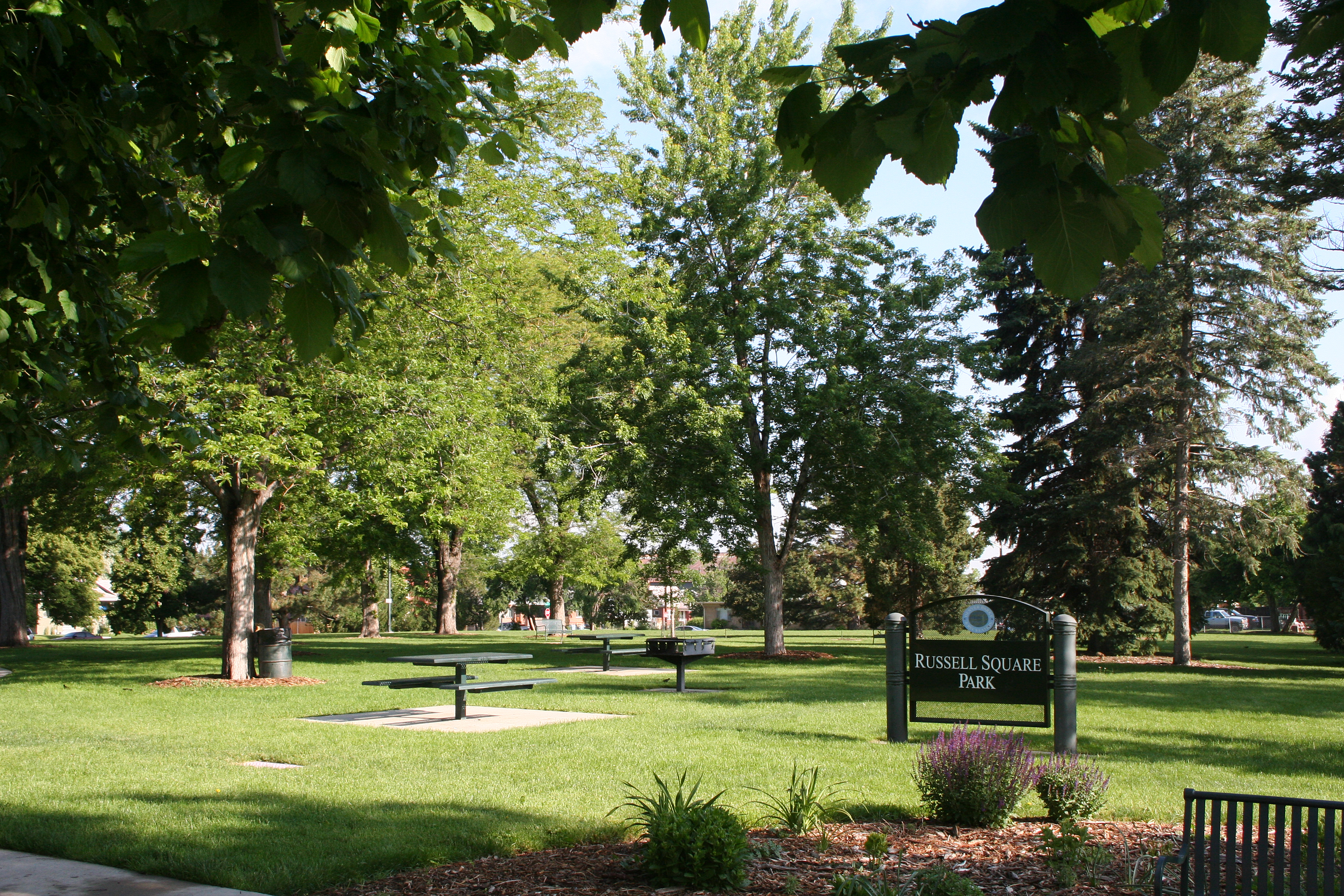
Russell Square Park in the Cole Neighborhood.

Cole is a neighborhood of Denver, Colorado. It is in the area commonly known as North Denver. According to the Piton Foundation in 2007 the population of the neighborhood was 6,041, and there were 1,794 housing units. At the time of the 2010 census, the racial breakdown of the neighborhood was 19.59% non-Hispanic white, 16.7% African American, 61.21% Hispanic or Latino, 0.43% Native American, and 0.45% Asian.

== Boundaries ==
The shape of the neighborhood is like that of a square with the northwest corner cut off. The neighborhood is bordered on the west by Downing Street, on the northwest by Walnut Street, on the north by 40th Avenue, on the east by York Street, and on the south by Martin Luther King Jr. Blvd. (32nd Avenue).

== Landmarks and history ==
Most of the neighborhood consists of single-family housing units. The Cole Neighborhood has two City Parks; Russell Square Park is in the northeast part of the neighborhood and St. Charles Park is in the northwest corner of the neighborhood. The neighborhood became part of Denver in 1874. It is named for Carlos M. Cole, a former superintendent of Denver Public Schools.

== Neighborhood association ==
Cole has an active neighborhood association and membership with representation on all major City projects in Cole and the Denver INC (Inter-Neighborhood Cooperation).

== See also ==
- Bibliography of Colorado
- Geography of Colorado
- History of Colorado
- Index of Colorado-related articles
- List of Colorado-related lists
  - List of neighborhoods in Denver
  - List of populated places in Colorado
- Outline of Colorado
