= Beierle Farm =

- Formerly listed on the U.S. National Register of Historic Places
- U.S. Historic district
- Beierle Farm site plan

- Location within Colorado Location within the United States
- Location: Hudson Rd. north of Irondale Rd., near Watkins
- Nearest city: Watkins, Colorado
- Coordinates: 39.86367°N 104.62079°W
- Area: 3 acres (1.2 ha)
- Built: 1890
- Built by: William Arter
- Architectural style: Late 19th and Early 20th Century American Movements, Hipped Cottage
- MPS: Denver International Airport MPS
- NRHP reference No.: 92001673

Significant dates
- Added to NRHP: December 23, 1992
- Removed from NRHP: November 9, 2007

The Beierle Farm near Watkins, Colorado was started in 1890. It was listed on the National Register of Historic Places in 1992 but was later delisted.

It was farmed by Ray Beierle and family. He farmed there from 1929 to 1938, moved to a farm near Erie (about 30 miles away), then returned in 1945. The family remained at the Beierle Farm until 1990.

It included Late 19th and Early 20th Century American Movements architecture. It was also known as Arter Farm, as Knapff Farm, and as Hill Farm. The NRHP listing included four contributing buildings, three contributing structures and one contributing site on 3 acres (1.2 ha).

It was delisted from the National Register on November 7, 2007 after demolition.
