= Elizabeth Allen Sopris Memorial =

Monument in Denver, Colorado, U.S.

- The memorial in 2025
- Location: Denver, Colorado, U.S.
- 39°44′46.2″N 104°57′10.3″W

The Elizabeth Allen Sopris Memorial is installed in Denver, Colorado, United States.

== Description ==
The memorial has a granite bench with a statue and a pool. The bench is 179" long. It also has a sundial.

== History ==
The memorial was installed in 1925. It was surveyed by the Smithsonian Institution's "Save Outdoor Sculpture!" program in 1993.
