= Geography of Colorado =

Map of Colorado

Colorado map of Köppen climate classification

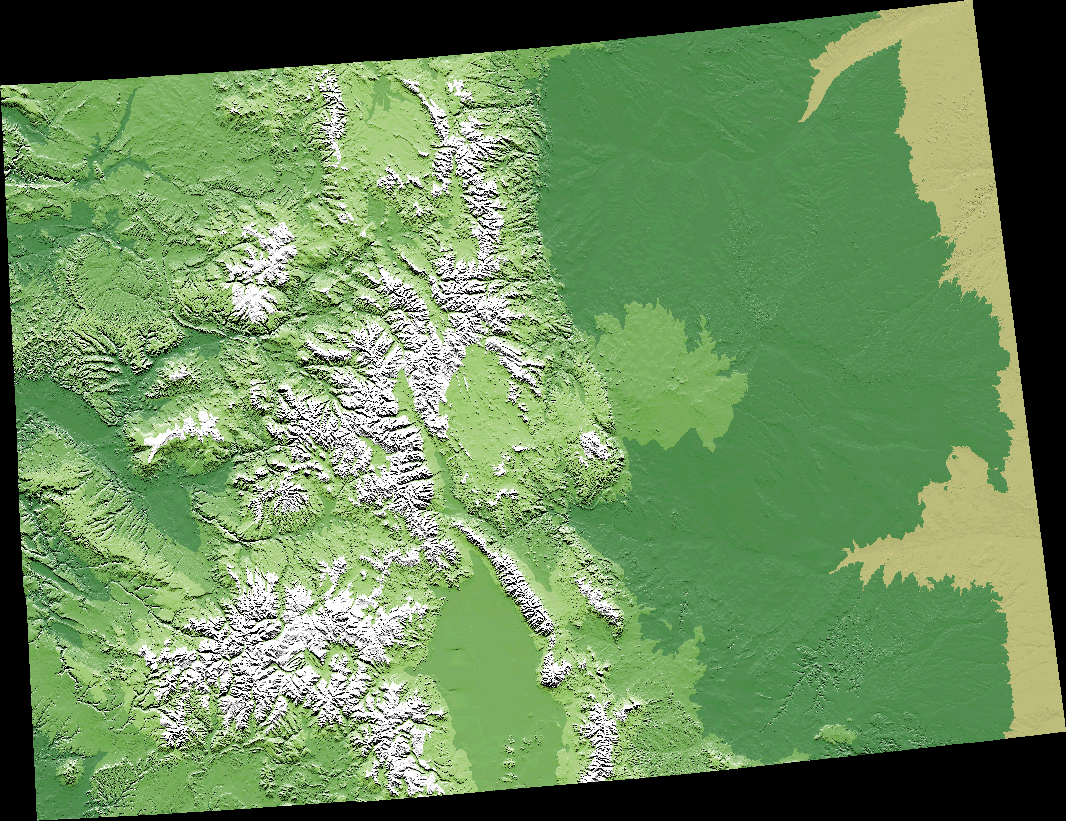
A digital elevation model relief map of Colorado

The geography of the U.S. State of Colorado is diverse, encompassing rugged mountainous terrain, vast plains, desert lands, desert canyons, and mesas. Colorado is a landlocked U.S. state. In 1861, the United States Congress defined the boundaries of the new Territory of Colorado exclusively by lines of latitude and longitude, stretching from 37°N to 41°N latitude, and from 102°02'48"W to 109°02'48"W longitude (25°W to 32°W from the Washington Meridian). Starting in 1868, official surveys demarcated the boundaries, deviating from the parallels and meridians in several places. Later surveys attempted to correct some of these mistakes but in 1925 the U.S. Supreme Court affirmed that the earlier demarcation was the official boundary. The borders of Colorado are now officially defined by 697 boundary markers connected by straight boundary lines, forming a shape called a hexahectaenneacontakaiheptagon. Colorado, Wyoming, and Utah are the only states that have their borders defined solely by straight boundary lines with no natural features. The southwest corner of Colorado is the Four Corners Monument at 36°59'56"N, 109°2'43"W. This is the only place in the United States where four states meet: Colorado, New Mexico, Arizona, and Utah.

The summit of Mount Elbert at 14,440 feet (4,401.2 m) elevation in Lake County is the state's highest point and the highest point in the Rocky Mountains of North America. Colorado has approximately 550 mountain peaks that exceed 10,000 feet (4,000 meters) elevation. The state's lowest elevation is 3,317 feet (1,011 m) at the point on the eastern boundary of Yuma County where the Arikaree River flows into the state of Kansas. This is the highest low point of any state, and Colorado and Wyoming are the only two states that lie entirely above 3000 feet (1000 m) elevation.

As is common in mountainous and adjacent areas, microclimates exist and weather is strongly influenced by orography. A notable regional atmospheric phenomenon is the Denver Convergence Vorticity Zone (DCVZ) and related Denver Cyclone occurring on the High Plains just east of Denver. The Rocky Mountains as a whole induce significant changes in weather afar, such as the Colorado low.

== Regions ==
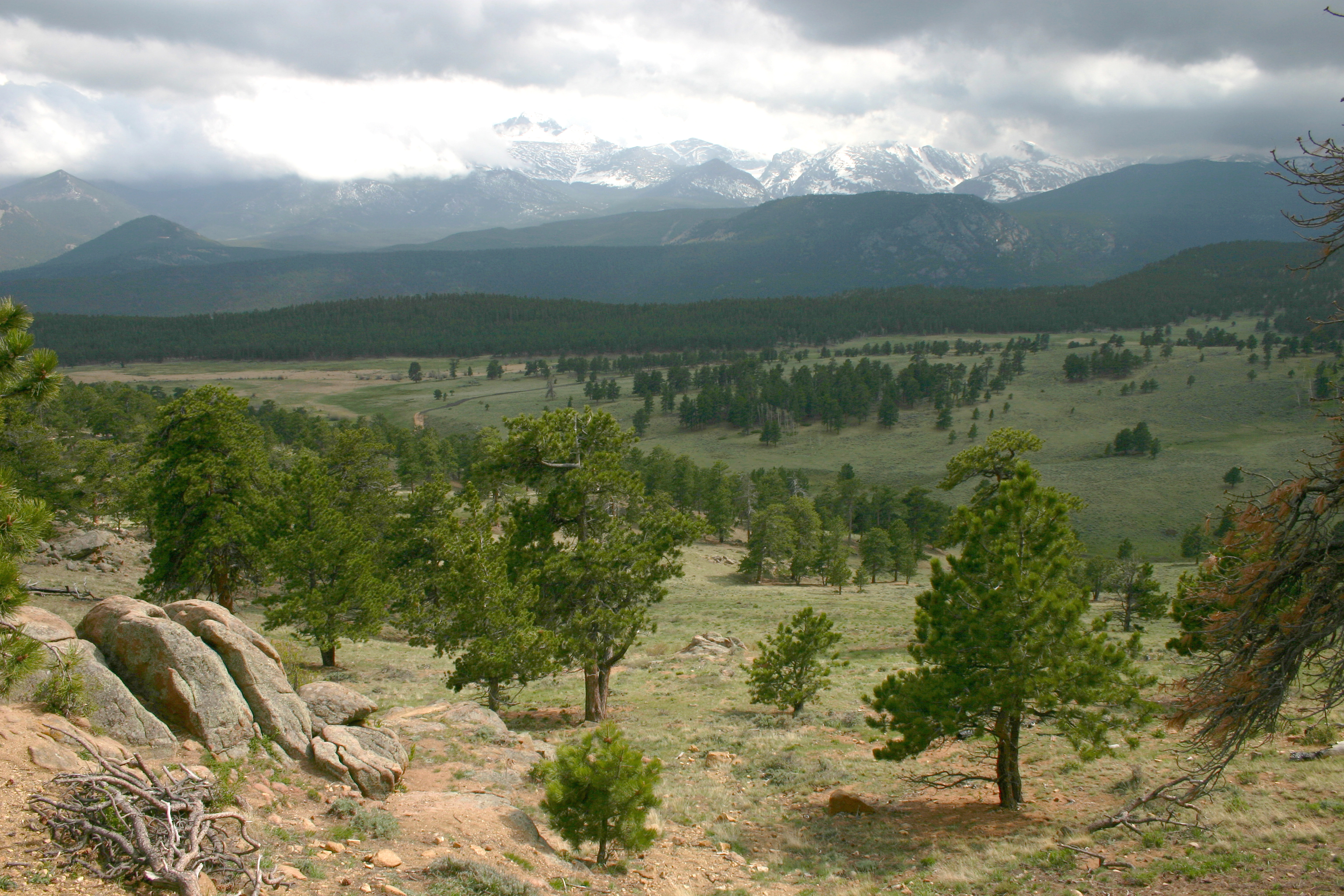
Rocky Mountain National Park

To the east of the Rocky Mountains in Colorado are the Colorado Eastern Plains/High Plains, the section of the Great Plains within Colorado at elevations ranging from 3,500 to 7,000 feet (1,100 to 2,100 meters). The Midwest states of Kansas and Nebraska border Colorado to the east and northeast.

The plains are sparsely settled with most population along the South Platte and the Arkansas rivers. Rainfall is meager, averaging about 15 inches (380 mm) annually. There is some irrigated farming, but much of the land is used for dryland farming or ranching. Winter wheat is a typical crop and most small towns in the region boast both a water tower and a grain elevator.

The bulk of Colorado's population lives along the eastern edge of the Rocky Mountains in the Front Range Urban Corridor. This region is partially protected from prevailing storms by the high mountains to the west.

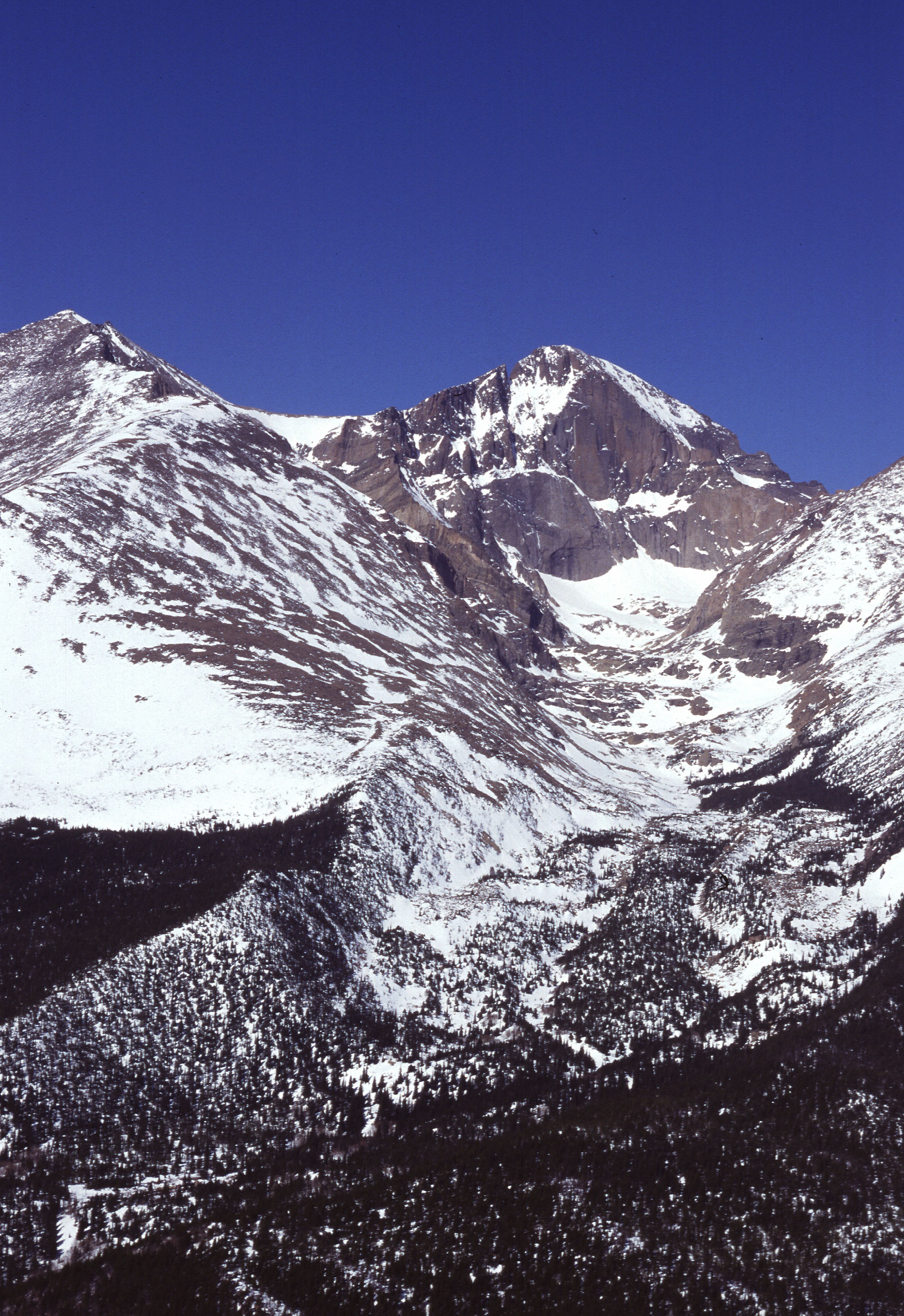
Snowpack accumulation at 14,255 ft (4,345 m) on Longs Peak in Rocky Mountain National Park

To the west lies the eastern slope of the Rocky Mountains with notable peaks such as Longs Peak, Mount Blue Sky, Pikes Peak, and the Spanish Peaks near Walsenburg in the south. This area drains to the east, is forested, and partially urbanized. With urbanization, utilization of the forest for timbering and grazing resulted in accumulation of fuel. During the drought of 2002 devastating forest fires swept this area.

The Continental Divide stretches along the crest of the Rocky Mountains. To the west of the Continental Divide is the Western Slope. Water west of the Continental Divide drains west into the Pacific Ocean via the Colorado River. Western Colorado is made up of mountains, mesas, desert canyons, and desert lands.

Within the interior of the Rocky Mountains are several large parks or high broad basins. In the north, on the east side of the Continental Divide is North Park. North Park is drained by the North Platte River, which flows north into the northwest state of Wyoming. Just south but on the west side of the Continental Divide is Middle Park, drained by the Colorado River. South Park is the headwaters of the South Platte River. To the south lies the San Luis Valley, the headwaters of the Rio Grande, which drains into New Mexico. Across the Sangre de Cristo Range to the east of the San Luis Valley lies the Wet Mountain Valley. These basins, particularly the San Luis Valley, lie along the Rio Grande Rift, a major tectonic feature. See Rift.

The Rocky Mountains within Colorado contain 54 peaks that are 14,000 ft (4,300 m) or higher, known as fourteeners. The mountains are timbered with conifers and aspen to the tree line, at an elevation of about 12,000 ft (3,700 m) in southern Colorado to about 10,500 ft (3,200 m) in northern Colorado; above this only alpine vegetation grows. The Rockies are snow-covered only in the winter; most snow melts by mid-August with the exception of a few small glaciers. The Colorado Mineral Belt, stretching from the San Juan Mountains in the southwest to Boulder and Central City on the front range, contains most of the historic gold and silver mining districts of Colorado.

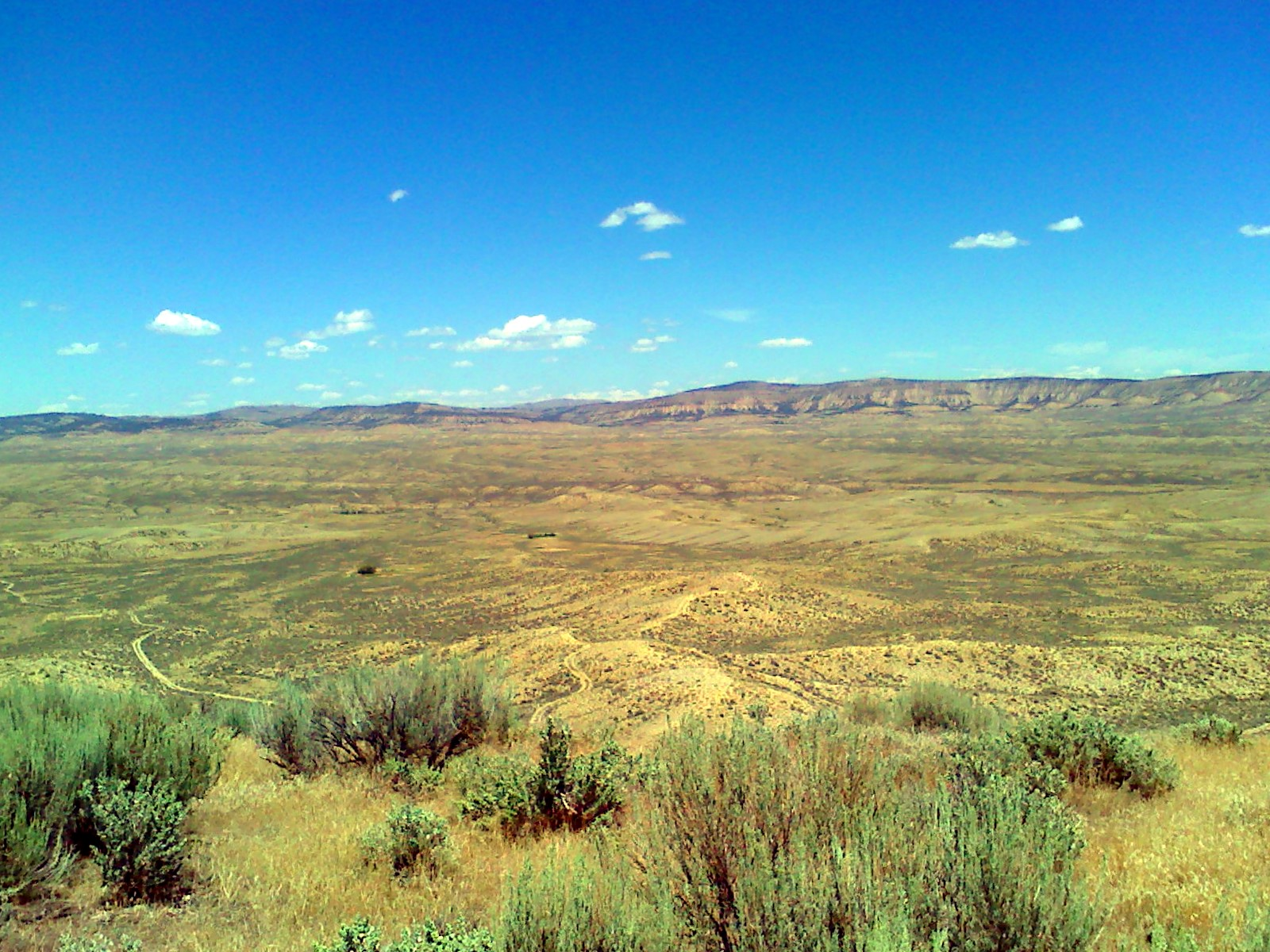
Sagebrush Shrubland is typical of Northwestern Colorado. This ecosystem dominates here in Wolf Creek Wildlife Management Area, near Massadona, CO.

The Western Slope is generally drained by the Colorado River and its tributaries. Notable to the south are the San Juan Mountains, an extremely rugged mountain range, and to the west of the San Juans, the Colorado Plateau, a high desert extending into neighboring states. Grand Junction is the largest city on the Western Slope. Grand Junction is served by Interstate Highway 70. To the southeast of Grand Junction is Grand Mesa, a large flat-topped desert mountain. Further east are the ski resort communities of Aspen, Vail, Crested Butte, and Steamboat Springs. The northwestern corner of Colorado bordering Northern Utah and Western Wyoming is mostly sparsely populated rangeland.

From west to east, the state consists of desert basins, desert canyons and mesas, turning into desert plateaus, then alpine mountains, and then the grasslands of the High Plains. Mount Elbert is the highest peak in the Rocky Mountains of North America. The famous Pikes Peak is just west of Colorado Springs. Its lone peak is visible from near the Kansas border on clear days.

== Climate statistics for selected cities ==
Climate data for Denver (DIA; elev 5414 ft), 1991−2020 normals, (Note: Mean monthly maxima and minima (i.e. the highest and lowest temperature readings during an entire month or year) calculated based on data at said location from 1991 to 2020.) extremes 1872−present (Note: The official weather records for Denver were recorded in Downtown Denver from January 1872 to December 1949, at Stapleton International Airport from January 1950 to February 1995, and at Denver International Airport since March 1995.)
Month	Jan	Feb	Mar	Apr	May	Jun	Jul	Aug	Sep	Oct	Nov	Dec	Year
Record high °F (°C)	76 (24)	80 (27)	87 (31)	90 (32)	95 (35)	105 (41)	105 (41)	105 (41)	101 (38)	90 (32)	83 (28)	79 (26)	105 (41)
Mean maximum °F (°C)	65.0 (18.3)	67.1 (19.5)	74.7 (23.7)	80.8 (27.1)	88.3 (31.3)	96.5 (35.8)	99.6 (37.6)	96.9 (36.1)	92.9 (33.8)	84.1 (28.9)	73.6 (23.1)	65.3 (18.5)	100.6 (38.1)
Mean daily maximum °F (°C)	44.6 (7.0)	45.7 (7.6)	55.7 (13.2)	61.7 (16.5)	71.2 (21.8)	83.4 (28.6)	89.9 (32.2)	87.5 (30.8)	79.6 (26.4)	65.3 (18.5)	52.9 (11.6)	44.0 (6.7)	65.1 (18.4)
Daily mean °F (°C)	31.7 (−0.2)	32.7 (0.4)	41.6 (5.3)	47.8 (8.8)	57.4 (14.1)	68.2 (20.1)	75.1 (23.9)	72.9 (22.7)	64.8 (18.2)	51.1 (10.6)	39.4 (4.1)	31.2 (−0.4)	51.2 (10.6)
Mean daily minimum °F (°C)	18.7 (−7.4)	19.7 (−6.8)	27.5 (−2.5)	33.9 (1.1)	43.6 (6.4)	53.0 (11.7)	60.2 (15.7)	58.3 (14.6)	50.0 (10.0)	37.0 (2.8)	26.0 (−3.3)	18.4 (−7.6)	37.2 (2.9)
Mean minimum °F (°C)	−3.8 (−19.9)	−1.5 (−18.6)	9.5 (−12.5)	19.8 (−6.8)	30.2 (−1.0)	41.9 (5.5)	51.4 (10.8)	48.8 (9.3)	35.9 (2.2)	19.6 (−6.9)	5.4 (−14.8)	−3.4 (−19.7)	−11.0 (−23.9)
Record low °F (°C)	−29 (−34)	−25 (−32)	−11 (−24)	−2 (−19)	19 (−7)	30 (−1)	42 (6)	40 (4)	17 (−8)	−2 (−19)	−18 (−28)	−25 (−32)	−29 (−34)
Average precipitation inches (mm)	0.38 (9.7)	0.41 (10)	0.86 (22)	1.68 (43)	2.16 (55)	1.94 (49)	2.14 (54)	1.58 (40)	1.35 (34)	0.99 (25)	0.64 (16)	0.35 (8.9)	14.48 (368)
Average snowfall inches (cm)	6.4 (16)	7.6 (19)	8.8 (22)	6.2 (16)	1.4 (3.6)	0.0 (0.0)	0.0 (0.0)	0.0 (0.0)	0.8 (2.0)	3.9 (9.9)	7.3 (19)	6.6 (17)	49.0 (124)
Average extreme snow depth inches (cm)	3.8 (9.7)	4.7 (12)	4.0 (10)	2.2 (5.6)	0.5 (1.3)	0.0 (0.0)	0.0 (0.0)	0.0 (0.0)	0.1 (0.25)	2.0 (5.1)	4.1 (10)	5.3 (13)	9.0 (23)
Average precipitation days (≥ 0.01 in)	4.4	5.5	6.2	9.0	10.4	8.1	8.3	7.5	6.0	5.3	4.6	4.4	79.7
Average snowy days (≥ 0.1 in)	5.0	5.3	4.8	4.1	0.8	0.0	0.0	0.0	0.4	1.8	4.6	4.6	31.4
Average relative humidity (%)	55.2	55.8	53.7	49.6	51.7	49.3	47.8	49.3	50.1	49.2	56.3	56.6	52.0
Average dew point °F (°C)	12.7 (−10.7)	16.2 (−8.8)	19.9 (−6.7)	26.2 (−3.2)	35.8 (2.1)	43.5 (6.4)	48.4 (9.1)	47.7 (8.7)	39.6 (4.2)	28.6 (−1.9)	21.0 (−6.1)	14.2 (−9.9)	29.5 (−1.4)
Mean monthly sunshine hours	215.3	211.1	255.6	276.2	290.0	315.3	325.0	306.4	272.3	249.2	194.3	195.9	3,106.6
Mean daily daylight hours	9.7	10.7	12.0	13.3	14.4	15.0	14.7	13.7	12.4	11.1	10.0	9.4	12.2
Percentage possible sunshine	72	70	69	69	65	70	71	72	73	72	65	67	70
Average ultraviolet index	2	2	3	3	5	6	6	5	5	3	2	2	4
Source 1: NOAA (sun, relative humidity and dew point 1961−1990)
Source 2: Weather Atlas (Daylight-Average UV index)

Climate data for Grand Junction, Colorado (Grand Junction Regional Airport), 1991–2020 normals, (Note: Mean monthly maxima and minima (i.e. the expected highest and lowest temperature readings at any point during the year or given month) calculated based on data at said location from 1981 to 2010.) extremes 1893–present (Note: Official records for Grand Junction were kept at downtown from January 1893 to December 1899 and at Grand Junction Regional Airport since January 1900. For more information, see ThreadEx.)
Month	Jan	Feb	Mar	Apr	May	Jun	Jul	Aug	Sep	Oct	Nov	Dec	Year
Record high °F (°C)	62 (17)	71 (22)	88 (31)	89 (32)	101 (38)	105 (41)	107 (42)	104 (40)	102 (39)	89 (32)	76 (24)	66 (19)	107 (42)
Mean maximum °F (°C)	49.6 (9.8)	60.0 (15.6)	72.6 (22.6)	81.3 (27.4)	90.9 (32.7)	99.4 (37.4)	102.0 (38.9)	98.6 (37.0)	93.2 (34.0)	82.1 (27.8)	65.3 (18.5)	51.9 (11.1)	102.5 (39.2)
Mean daily maximum °F (°C)	38.1 (3.4)	46.4 (8.0)	58.3 (14.6)	65.8 (18.8)	76.8 (24.9)	89.2 (31.8)	94.5 (34.7)	90.9 (32.7)	81.7 (27.6)	66.9 (19.4)	51.8 (11.0)	38.8 (3.8)	66.6 (19.2)
Daily mean °F (°C)	27.7 (−2.4)	35.3 (1.8)	45.0 (7.2)	51.9 (11.1)	62.0 (16.7)	73.0 (22.8)	79.2 (26.2)	76.3 (24.6)	67.1 (19.5)	53.2 (11.8)	39.6 (4.2)	28.4 (−2.0)	53.2 (11.8)
Mean daily minimum °F (°C)	17.3 (−8.2)	24.1 (−4.4)	31.7 (−0.2)	38.1 (3.4)	47.1 (8.4)	56.8 (13.8)	63.9 (17.7)	61.6 (16.4)	52.5 (11.4)	39.5 (4.2)	27.5 (−2.5)	18.0 (−7.8)	39.8 (4.3)
Mean minimum °F (°C)	3.4 (−15.9)	10.3 (−12.1)	19.3 (−7.1)	25.4 (−3.7)	33.6 (0.9)	44.3 (6.8)	54.3 (12.4)	53.5 (11.9)	39.2 (4.0)	25.4 (−3.7)	13.8 (−10.1)	2.8 (−16.2)	−1.3 (−18.5)
Record low °F (°C)	−23 (−31)	−21 (−29)	5 (−15)	11 (−12)	24 (−4)	34 (1)	44 (7)	43 (6)	28 (−2)	6 (−14)	−4 (−20)	−21 (−29)	−23 (−31)
Average precipitation inches (mm)	0.61 (15)	0.53 (13)	0.80 (20)	0.98 (25)	0.83 (21)	0.41 (10)	0.59 (15)	0.92 (23)	1.19 (30)	0.99 (25)	0.61 (15)	0.60 (15)	9.06 (230)
Average snowfall inches (cm)	4.5 (11)	2.9 (7.4)	1.8 (4.6)	0.9 (2.3)	0.1 (0.25)	0.0 (0.0)	0.0 (0.0)	0.0 (0.0)	0.0 (0.0)	0.4 (1.0)	1.9 (4.8)	5.2 (13)	17.7 (44.35)
Average precipitation days (≥ 0.01 in)	6.3	6.1	6.7	7.1	6.4	3.4	4.8	6.5	6.5	6.2	5.4	6.1	71.6
Average snowy days (≥ 0.1 in)	4.6	3.5	1.7	0.7	0.1	0.0	0.0	0.0	0.0	0.5	2.0	5.0	18.1
Average relative humidity (%)	69.7	60.4	50.1	40.3	36.3	29.4	33.5	36.6	38.8	45.6	58.5	68.0	47.3
Mean monthly sunshine hours	192.3	204.4	240.9	278.0	328.5	359.3	356.2	329.8	292.2	255.1	186.9	180.0	3,203.6
Percentage possible sunshine	63	68	65	70	74	81	79	78	78	74	62	61	72
Source: NOAA (sun 1961–1990)

== See also ==
- Index of Colorado-related articles
- Colorado geographic regions
  - Southern Rocky Mountains
- List of cities and towns in Colorado
- List of Colorado fourteeners
- List of counties in Colorado
- List of drainage basins in Colorado
- List of mountain passes in Colorado
- List of mountain peaks of Colorado
- List of mountain peaks of the Rocky Mountains
- List of mountain ranges of Colorado
- List of rivers of Colorado
- List of waterfalls of Colorado
